= Jazz Frames =

Mirror shop in London, England

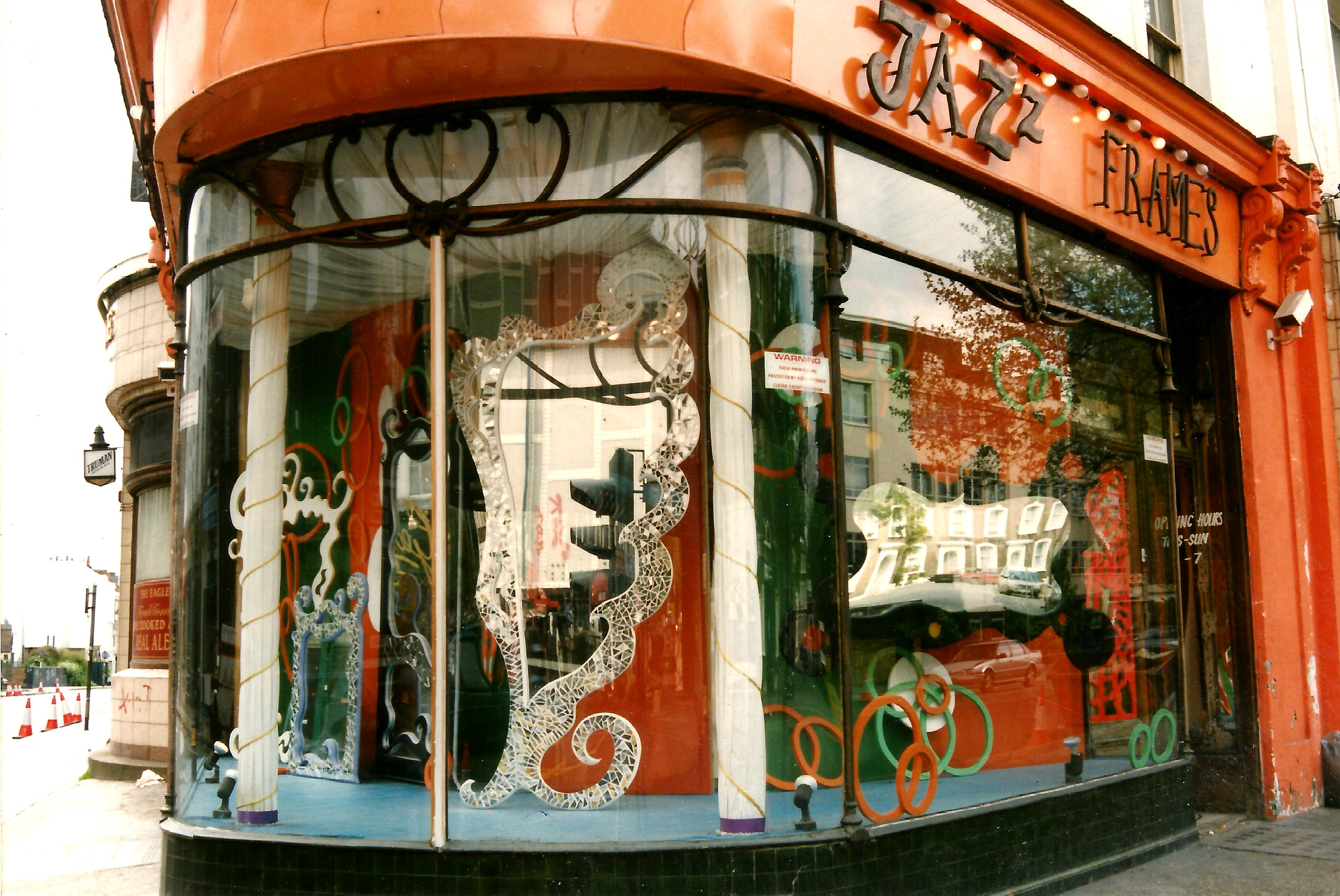
Jazz Frames mirror shop, 106 Camden Road, London

Jazz Frames was a designer mirror shop that specialised in experimental, handmade mirrors located at 106 Camden Road, London, the former premises of fashion brand Swanky Modes.

The owner and designer of the mirror brand was actress, singer and jazz promoter, Flavia Brilli, known for the popular British television series Beadle's About, her vocal work on the soundtrack of Peter Greenaway's film The Cook, the Thief, His Wife, and Her Lover and her music venue Central Bar jazz club. Born in Brighton, Flavia credited her hometown as the main inspiration behind her flamboyant designs: 'All my design work is inspired and informed by my enduring love for my hometown Brighton. A place forever associated in my mind with all that is fun, stylish and elegant'.

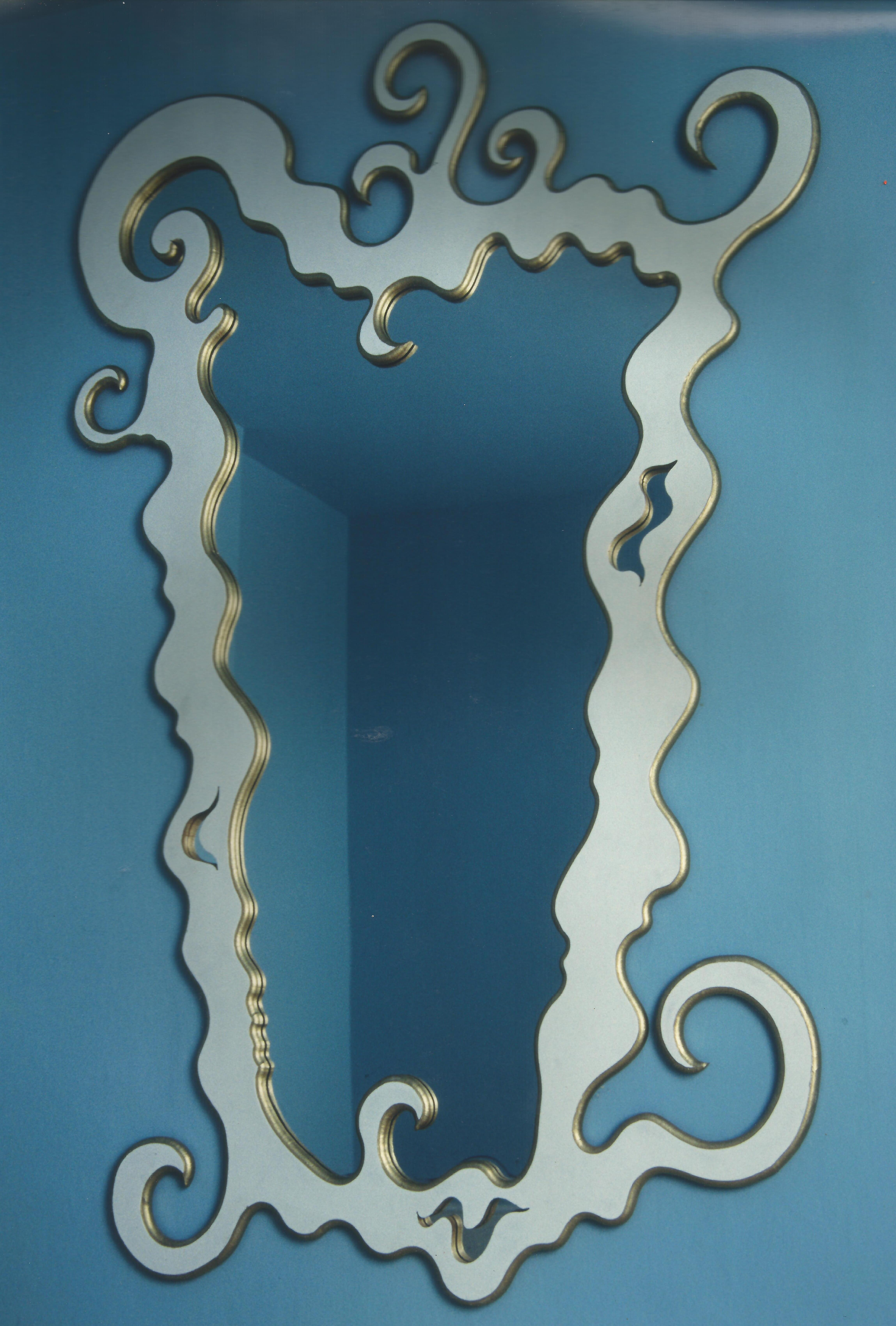
'Violetta' mirror by designer Flavia Brilli, owner of Jazz Frames.

The mirror designs were featured in various magazines and newspapers including Homeflair (1995), The London Magazine (1996), Essentials (1996), Elle Decoration (1996), Homes and Ideas (1996), Inspirations (1996), Time Out (1996), and the News of the World (1997). On 15 December 1996, two of the designs (the Fantasia mirror and Sunburst mirror) were used by Channel 4 television as a backdrop for the interview with film director Terry Gilliam in the Equinox documentary 'Dr Satan's Robot'.

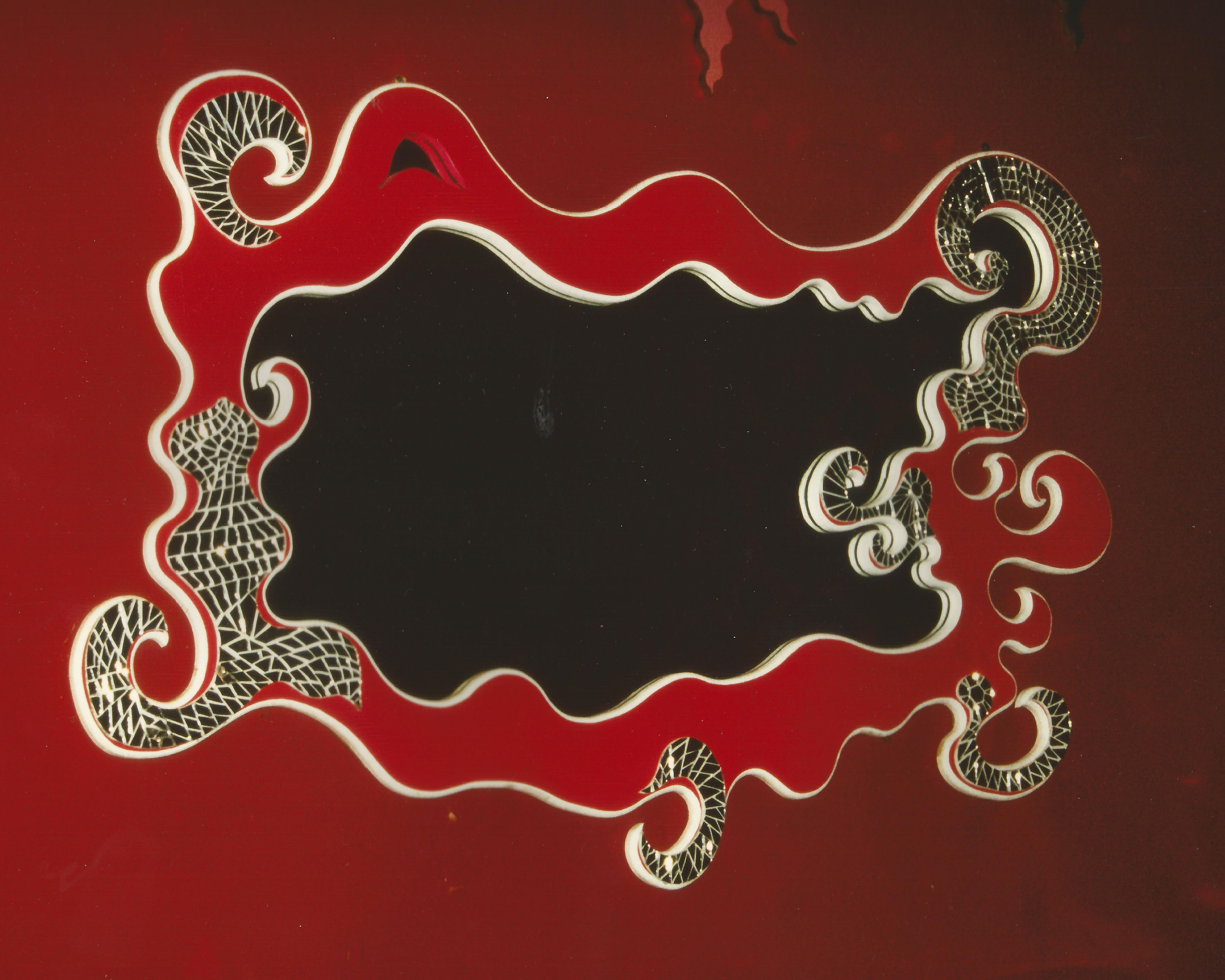
'Penelope Pitstop' mirror by Flavia Brilli. Owner and designer at Jazz Frames, Camden, London.

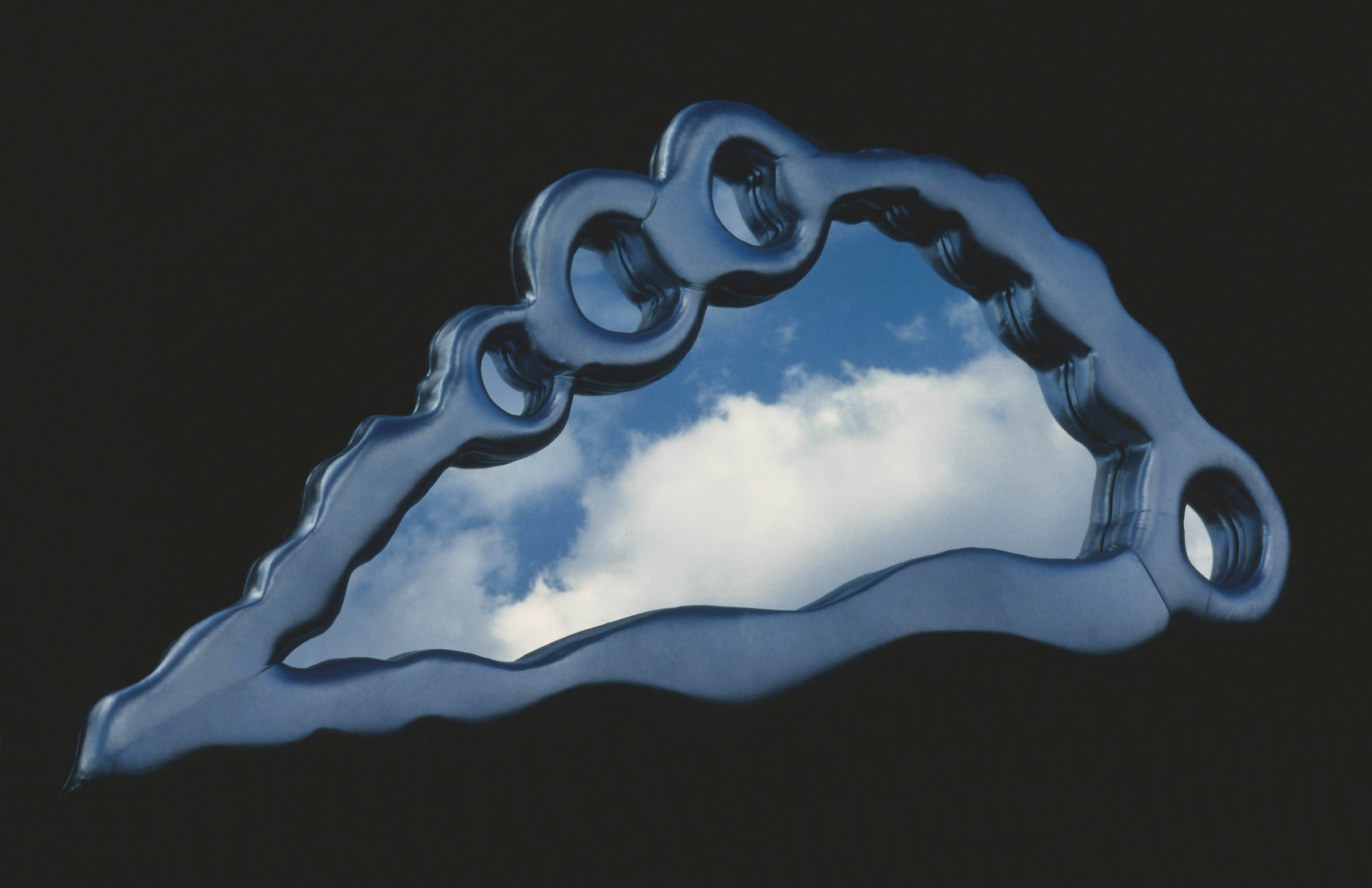
'Silver Zeppelin' mirror by Flavia Brilli upholstered in neoprene fabric, owner and designer of Jazz Frames.

The designs featured elaborate scrolling work, fabrics such as Neoprene, and hand-cut glass mosaics. The designs were also notable for their large dimensions. A selection of the largest designs were exhibited, in 1987, in the chill-out room of the superclub, Ministry of Sound, in London.

== Selected editorials ==
- 'Sunburst' mirror, Cover, page. Homeflair Magazine. November 1995, Vol 5, Issue 10. ISSN 0959-0749
- 'Sunburst' mirror pages 32–33. pg 35. Homeflair Magazine. November 1995, Issue 10. ISSN 0959-0749
- 'Emperor and Sun' mirrors pages 51- 54. Homeflair Magazine. May 1995. ISSN 0959-0749
- 'Violetta Mirror', pages 126. The London Magazine. January 1996. ISSN 1350-360X
- 'Wave Mirror', page 169. Elle Decoration. August 1996. ISSN 0957-8943
- 'Violetta' mirror, page 25. Inspirations. February 1996. ISSN 1350-8377
- 'Silver Zeppelin' centre page. News of the World. March 1999. ISSN 0028-9280
- 'Valentine Heart', page 16. Time Out. February 2000. ISSN 0049-3910
