= Jack Massarik =

British musician and jazz critic (died 2014)

Jack Massarik was a jazz journalist and musician. A jazz critic for more than 40 years, he provided continuous reportage for the London Evening Standard for 35 years from September 1979 until his death in July 2014, aged 74.

During his journalistic career, he was a regular guest on BBC Radio 4 and BBC Radio 3 offering his expert advice about current jazz trends and jazz musicians in podcast interviews. Along with The Guardian's jazz critic John Fordham, he regularly reviewed new jazz album releases and contributed reviews to the magazine Jazzwise for over 12 years.

Born in Stafford in the West Midlands to refugee parents who'd fled a war-torn Europe, Massarik learnt to play piano at the age of nine and then at 14 years of age played in a Big Band. During his time at the University of Manchester, he continued performing around the city, learning jazz piano and saxophone and compiling a what's-on column for the student newspaper. In the late Sixties he moved into journalism, progressed from local London papers to a career as a reporter and sub-editor with the Press Association in Fleet Street, and was a reporter/sub-editor on The Guardian newspaper's’ foreign and sports desks for more than 20 years.

As well as critiquing established British and International jazz musicians, he also championed new jazz musicians and supported one of the few British female jazz promoters and bookers, Flavia Brilli, who ran the Central Bar jazz club.

His long career as a journalist and jazz critic meant he was highly regarded by the jazz community and fellow jazz critics. A memorial service was held on July 30th 2014 attended by English jazz singer Claire Martin and British jazz pianist and broadcaster, Julian Joseph, both of whom worked with him regularly on BBC Radio 3’s Jazz Line Up

Managing director of Ronnie Scott's Jazz Club, Simon Cooke, said of Massarik:

“Jack was as much a fixture on the UK jazz scene as any musician,”... “His forthright and highly candid views mixed with his love for, and deep knowledge of, the music made him a must-read; his willingness to support the newer musicians led to the development of many of the UK's present jazz stars.”
