= Camden Road =

Road in London, England

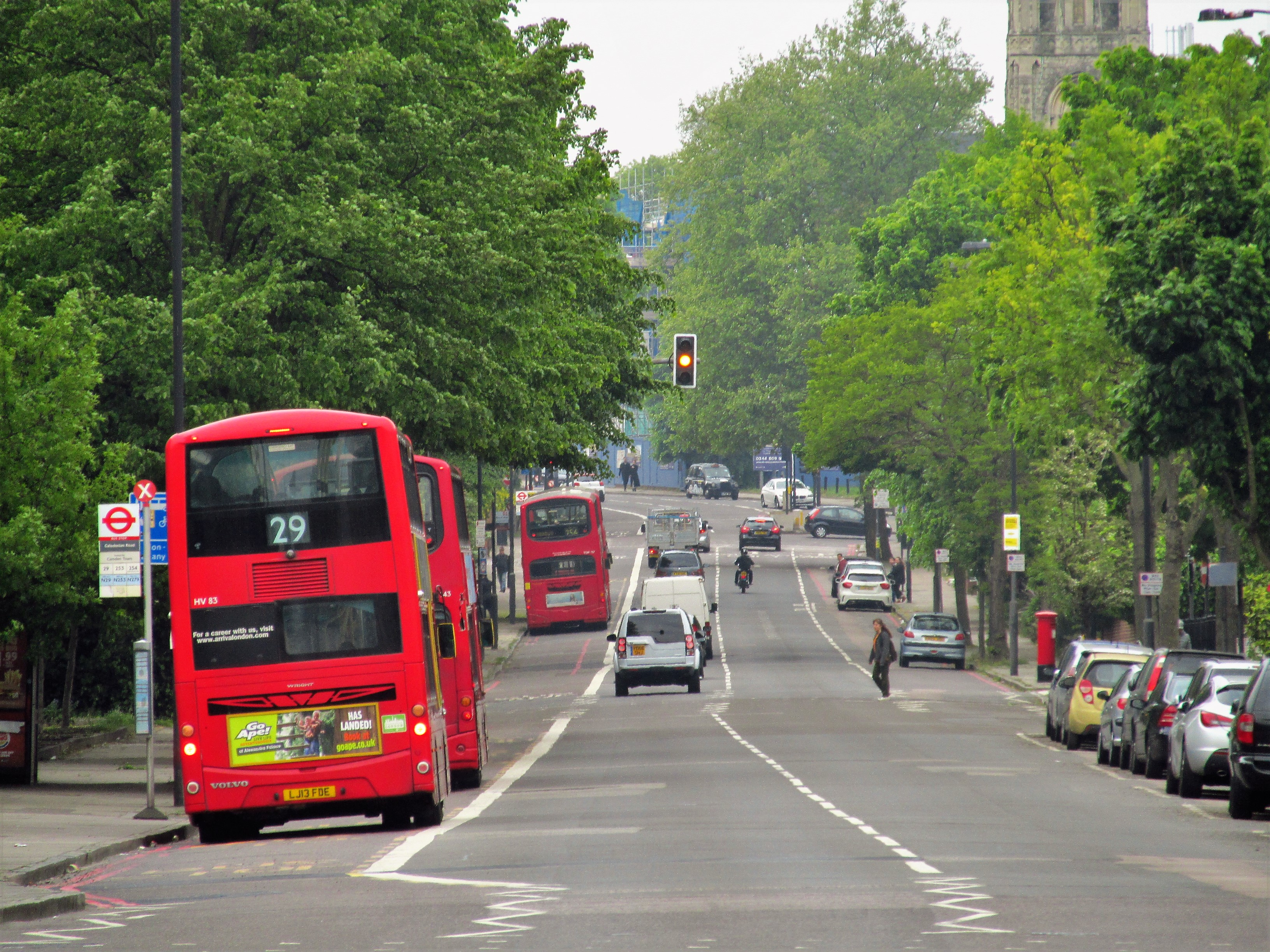
- Interactive map of Camden Road
- Length: 1.6 mi (2.6 km)
- Postal code: NW1
- southwest end: A400; Camden High Street, Kentish Town Road A4201; Parkway; 51.53904°N 0.14263°W

- northeast end: A1; Holloway Road A503; Tollington Road; 51.55610°N 0.11725°W

Camden Road is a main road in London running from the junction of Camden High Street and Camden Town Underground station up to Holloway Road. It is part of the A503 which continues east as Tollington Road.

== History ==
The route was created and developed in the 1820s. At the time, it ran through predominantly rural countryside, which remained the case until the mid-19th century. Holloway Prison opened on a former 10-acre (4.0 ha) field adjacent to Camden Road.

== Properties ==
The Athenaeum, Camden Road was located at the road's junction with Parkhurst Road following demands for an appropriate local literary and scientific institution. It was constructed in 1871 by F. R. Meeson and included various meeting halls, libraries and a 600-capacity theatre. It was subsequently taken over by the caterers Beale's and renamed the Athenaeum Hall. It was demolished in 1955 and replaced with a petrol station.

The Charity Organisation Society operated an Islington branch at No. 365 Camden Road. It was renamed as the Family Welfare Organisation in 1946 and subsequently became the local Citizen's Advice Bureau.

== Gallery ==
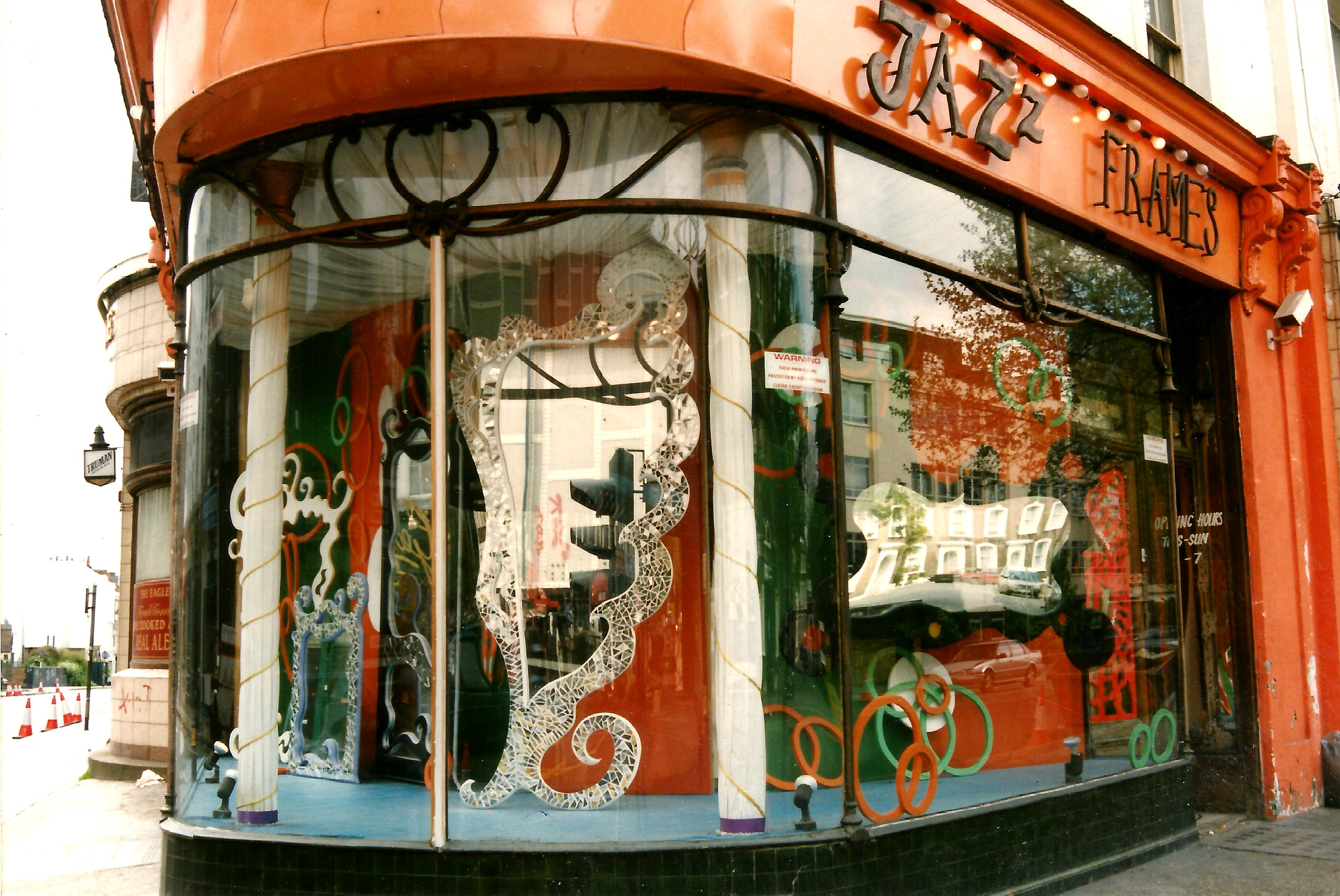
Jazz Frames designer mirror shop, 106 Camden Rd

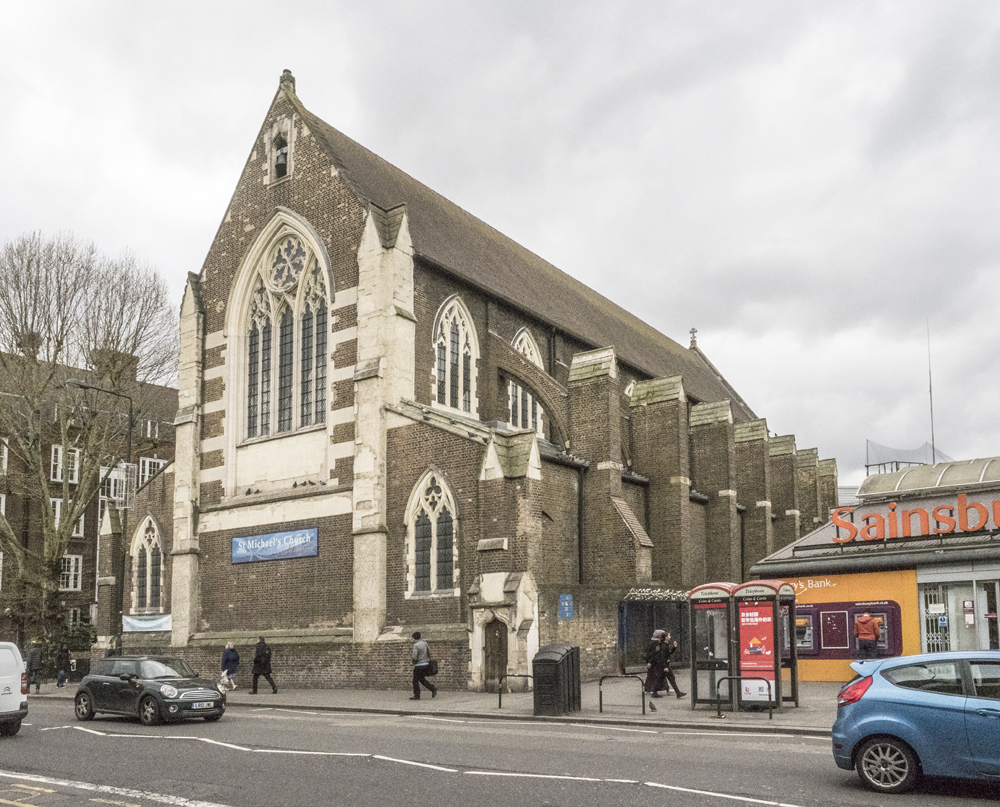
Camden Sainsbury's and St Michael's Parish Church

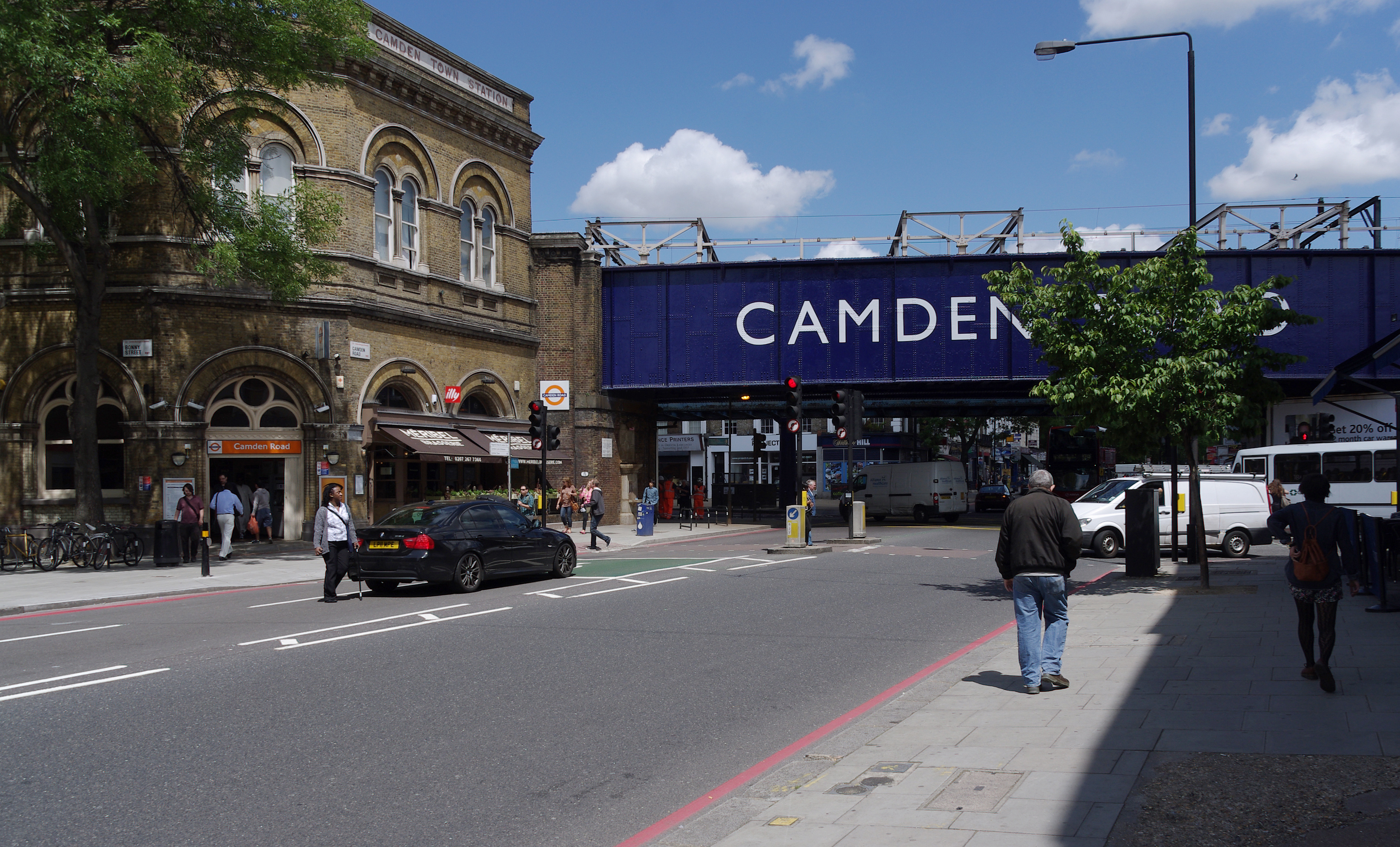
Camden Road railway station

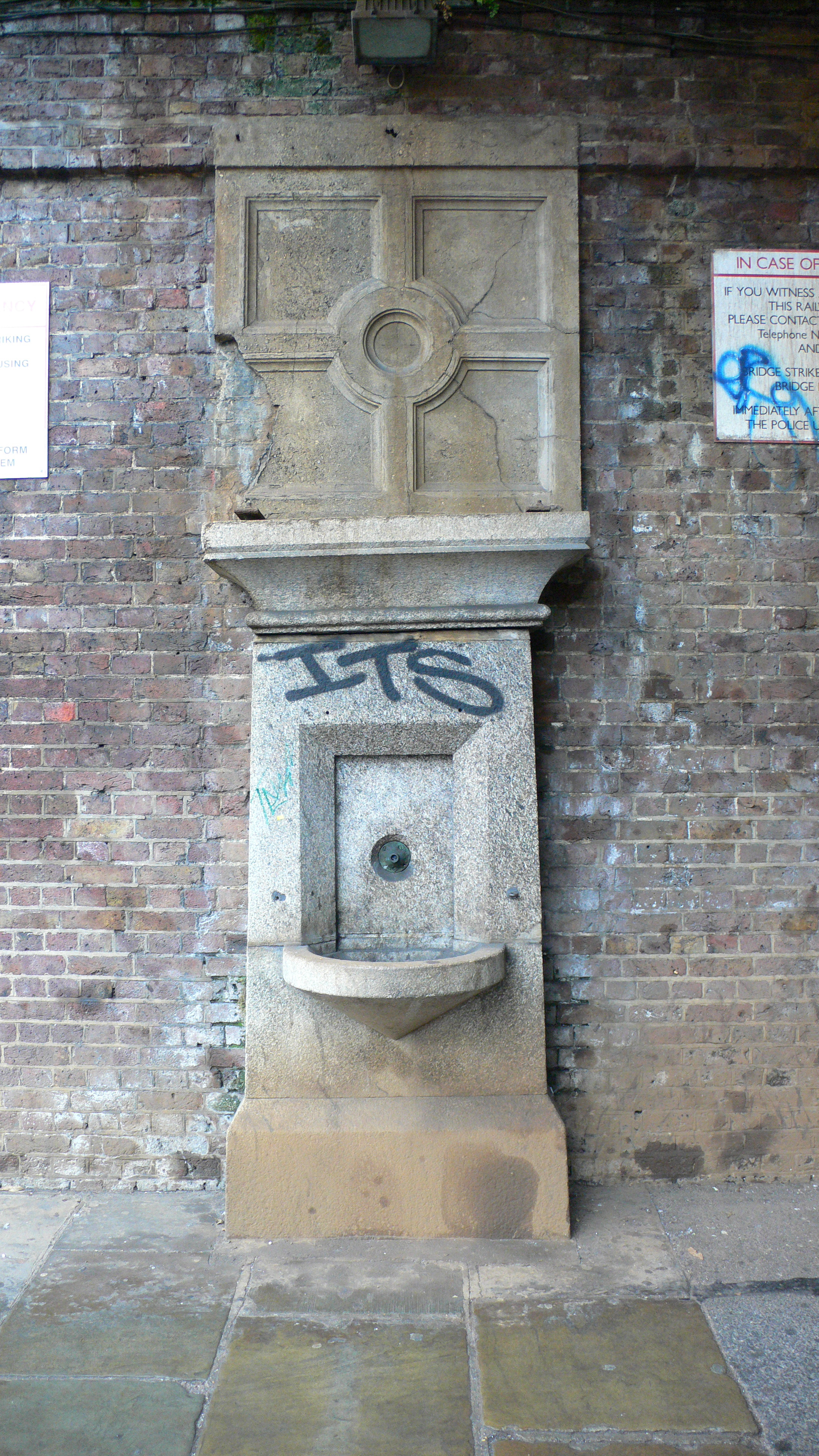
Drinking fountain

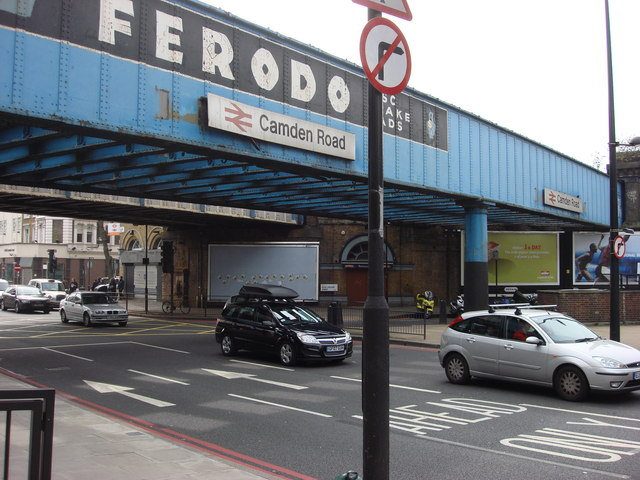
Disused Ferodo bridge

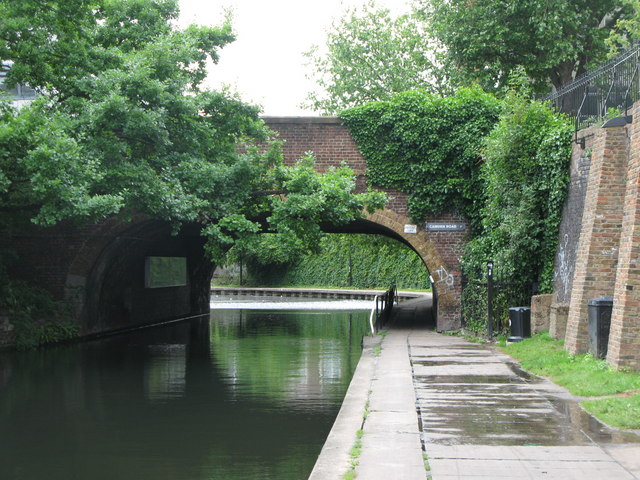
Bridge over Regent's Canal

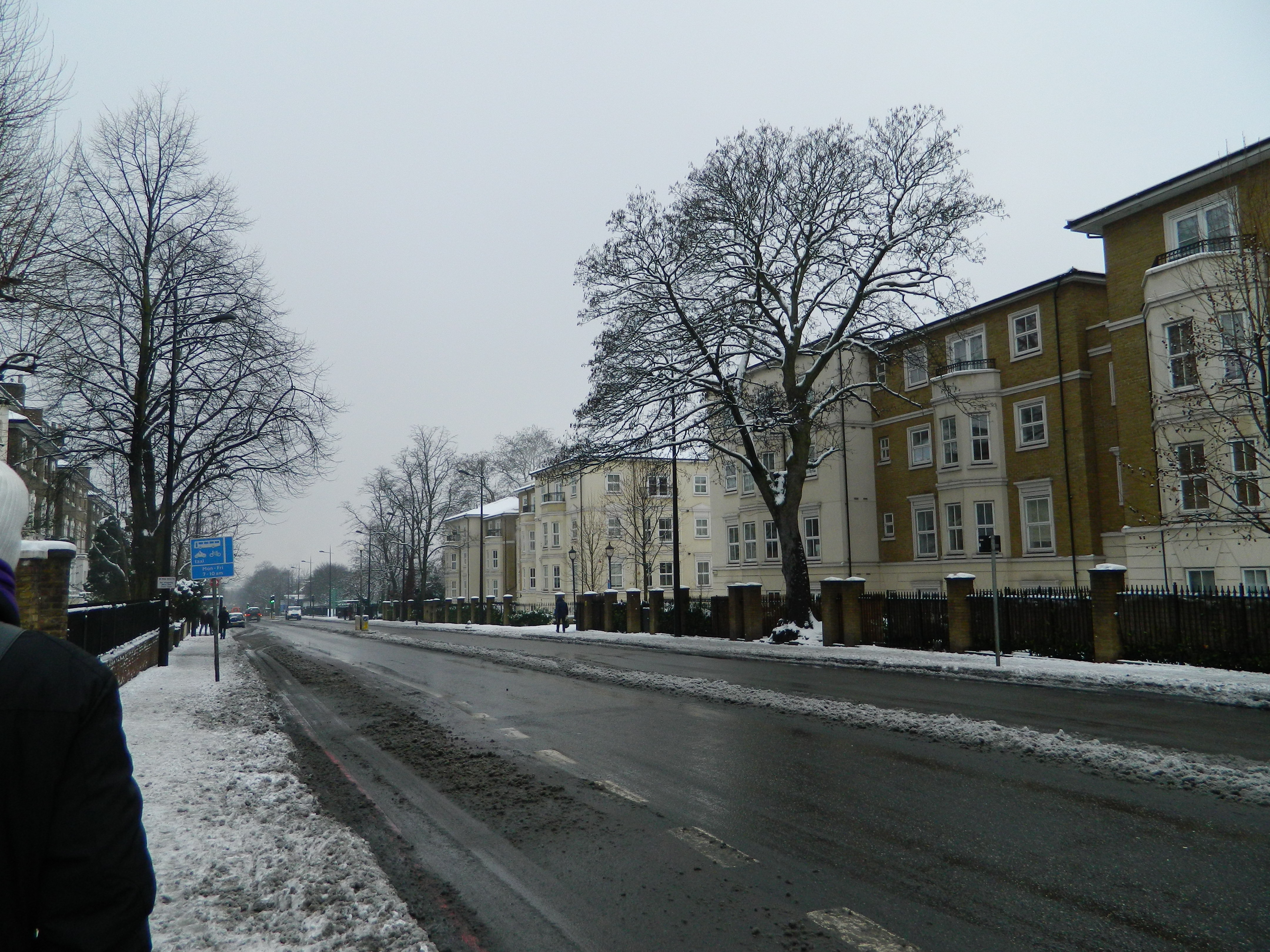
Snow

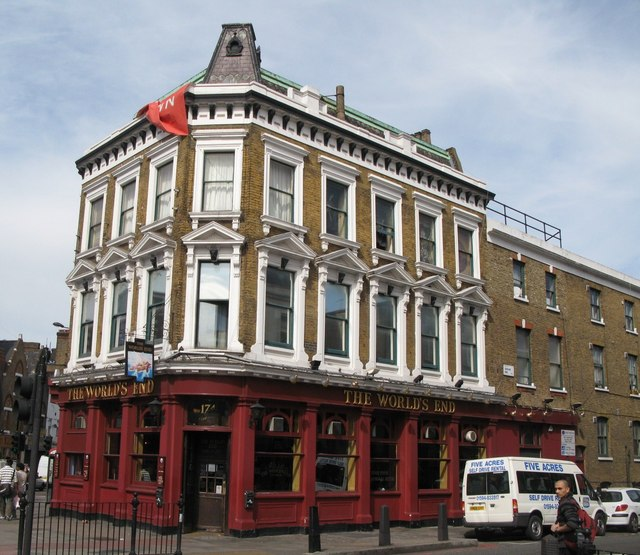
The World's End

== See also ==
- Jazz Frames
- Swanky Modes
