= Hi Fly =

Hi Fly may refer to:

- Hi Fly (airline), a Portuguese airline
- "Hi-Fly" (song), a jazz standard composed by Randy Weston
- Hi Fly (Peter King album), 1984
- Hi Fly (Rio Nido album), 1985
- Hi-Fly (Horace Parlan album), 1978
- Hi-Fly (Jaki Byard album), 1962
- Hi-Fly (Karin Krog and Archie Shepp album), 1976
