= Flavia Brilli =

Flavia Brilli is an English actress, singer, designer, photographer, and author.

== Early life ==
Flavia Brilli was born in Brighton, England. After completing a Foundation course at Eastbourne Art College, she undertook a Music and Fine Arts degree at the University of Brighton (then Brighton Polytechnic). While studying there, she met music manager Don Mousseau, and at the age of 20 made her singing debut, in 1986, at the London Hippodrome, in Leicester Square, performing the song "The Big Fight", written by Peter Godwin (singer) who also wrote "Criminal World" for David Bowie.

== Career ==
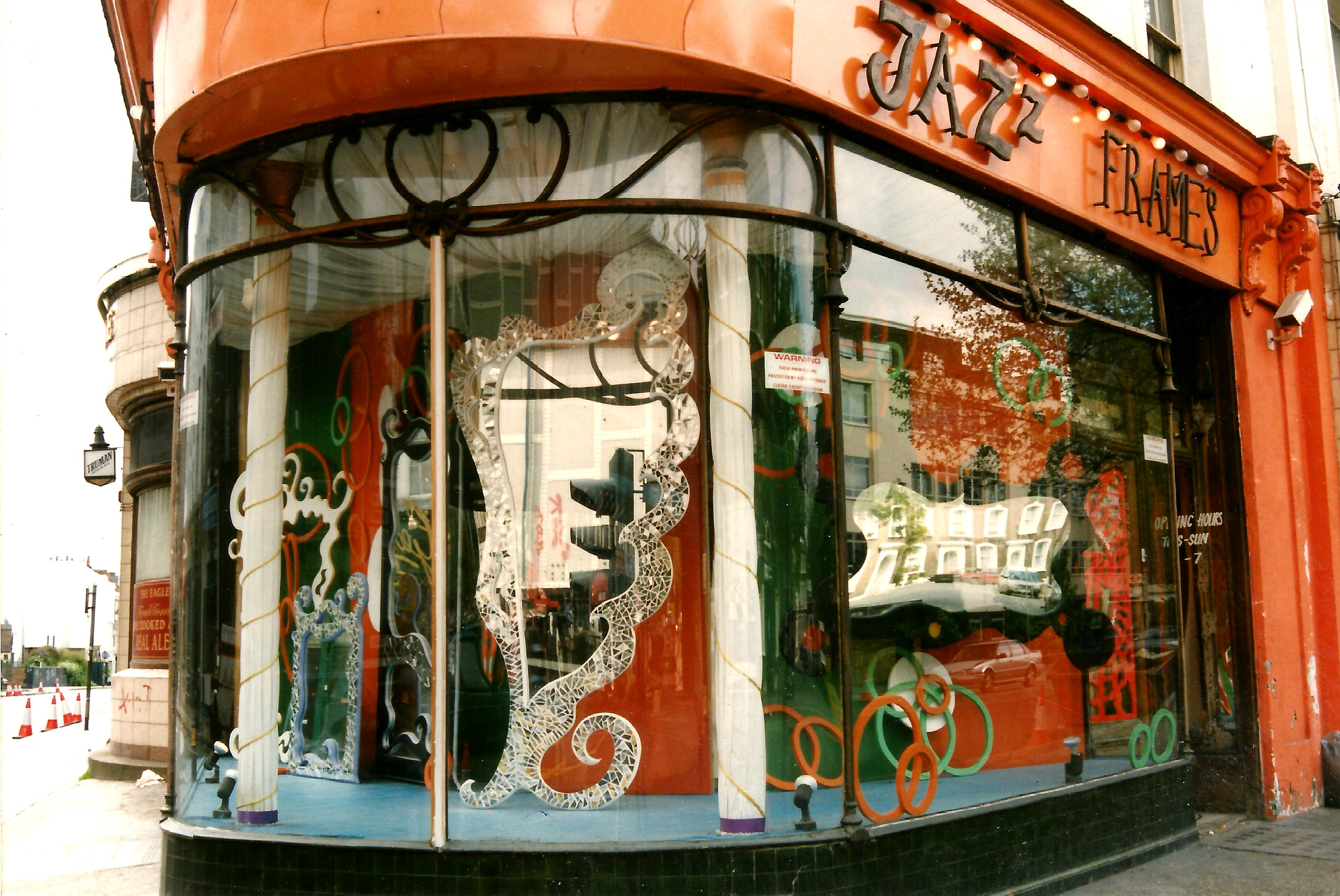
Designer Flavia Brilli's Mirror shop "Jazz Frames"

She moved to London in 1987, and first appeared on screen in the popular television series Beadle's About. Following the success of Beadle's About, she met the renowned composer Michael Nyman, longtime collaborator with filmmaker Peter Greenaway, and was chosen by Nyman to sing on the film and soundtrack of Peter Greenaway's film The Cook, The Thief, His Wife and Her Lover. Returning to her artistic roots, from 1991 to 1999, she designed and made original mirrors at her shop Jazz Frames in Camden, London. During this period, she achieved extensive editorial coverage in various design periodicals, including Homeflair (1995), The London Magazine (1996), Essentials (1996), Elle Decoration (1996), Homes and Ideas (1996), Inspirations (1996), Time Out (1996), and News of the World (1997). On 15 December 1996, her "Sunburst" mirror design was featured on the Channel 4 Equinox documentary "Satan's Robot" with Terry Gilliam of Monty Python. Brilli's mirrors were notable for being flamboyant, colourful, oversized, and experimental, including upholstering 8 ft x 4 ft mirrors in Neoprene. Of her mirrors, Brilli has said:

"All my design work is inspired and informed by my enduring love for my home town Brighton. A place forever associated in my mind with all that is fun, stylish, and elegant."

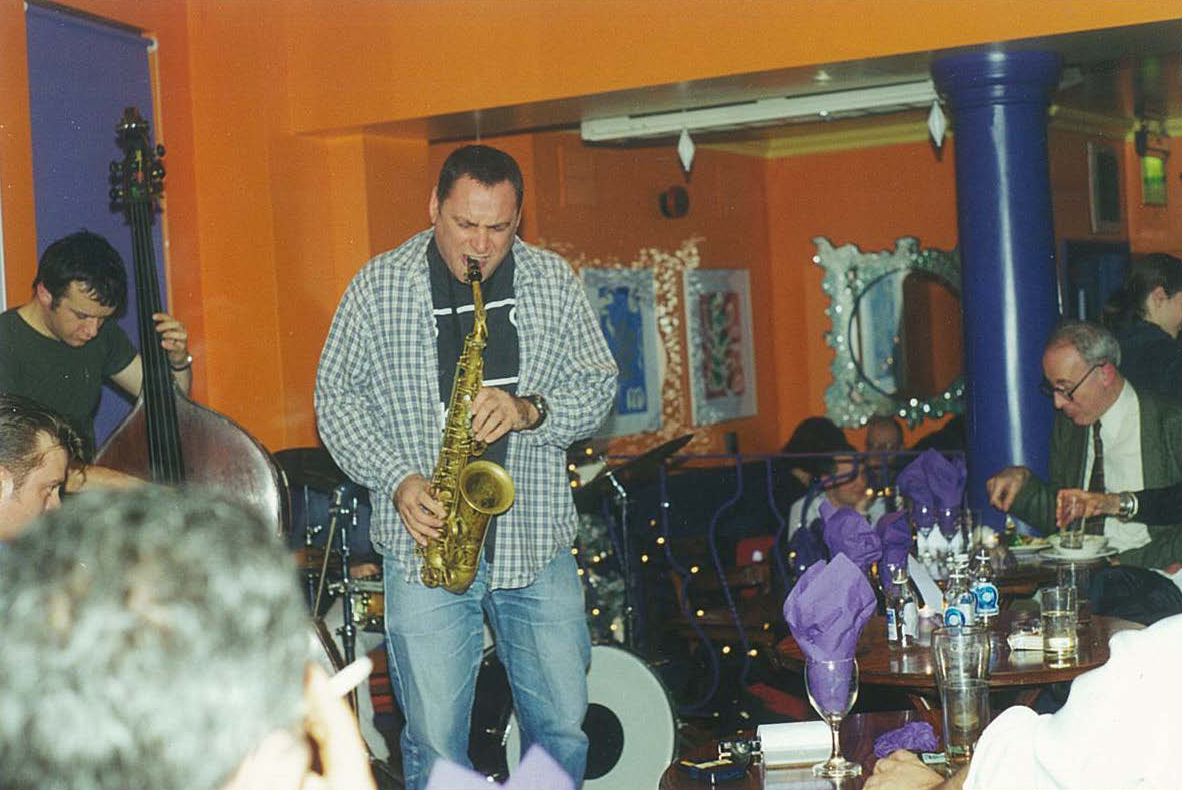
Gilad Atzmon performing at Central Bar jazz venue

From 1999 to 2004, she was offered an opportunity to run her own jazz club on the first floor of the Central Bar, at 58 Old Street, London, which then became known as the Central Bar jazz club. Her selective programme showcased Britain's finest jazz musicians and visiting international stars, and the venue became a fixture on London's jazz scene. British and international stars who performed at the Central Bar jazz club include award-winning British guitarist Jim Mullen, international star Gilad Atzmon, saxophonist legend Peter King, Mercury Nominee Sebastian Rochford, Young Jazz Musician of the Year Pete Wareham and revered trumpeter and composer Guy Barker.

Jazz critic Jack Massarik of the Evening Standard was a regular visitor and reviewer of the venue and later wrote a letter praising her proficiency and programme choices. Because of her selective policy of high quality performers, the venue regularly appeared in national newspapers and magazines including The Guardian, Time Out, and the London Evening Standard's entertainment supplement "Hot Tickets".

== Sculpture of Boris Johnson ==
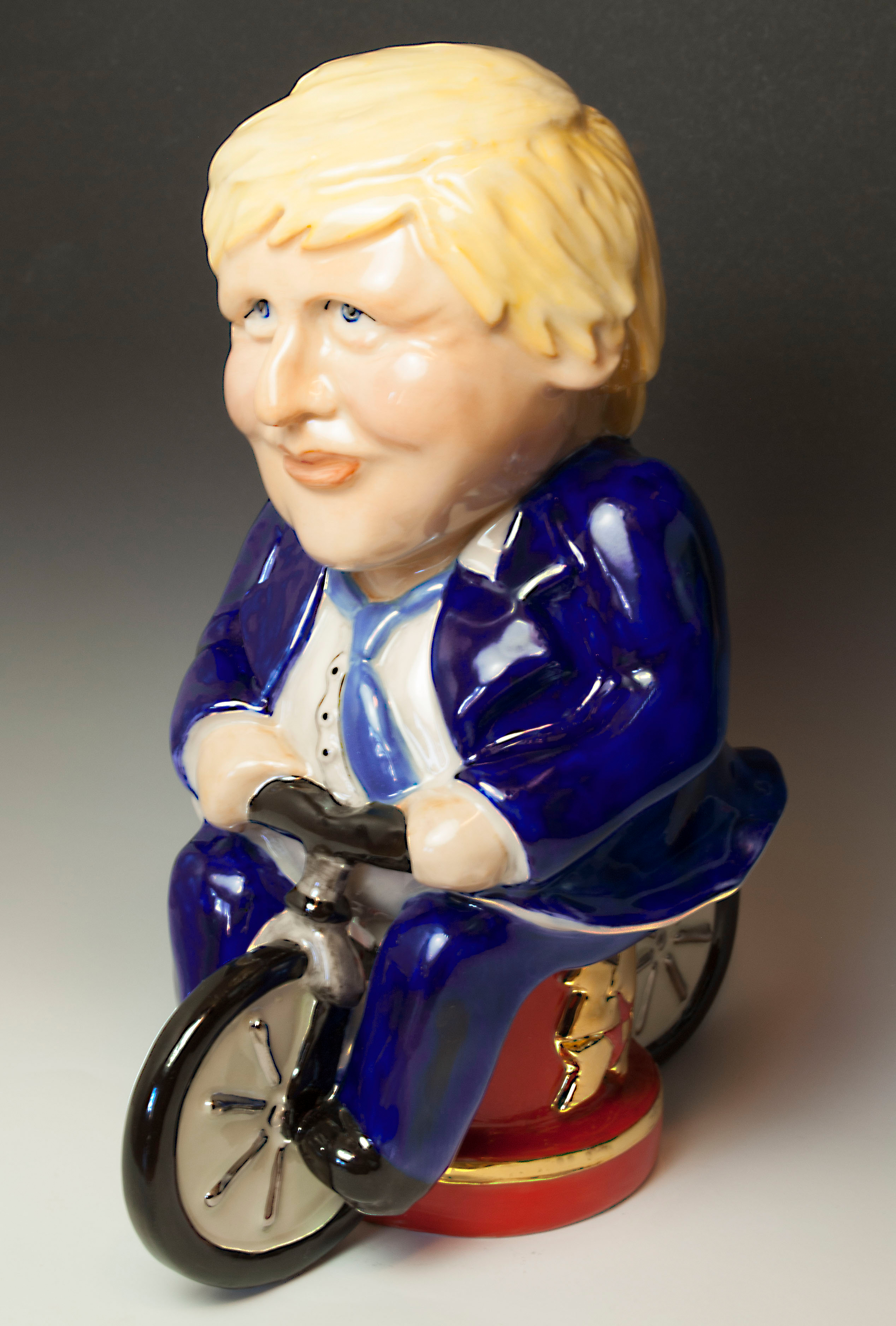
Boris Johnson commemorative 2012 Olympic Games Sculpture by Flavia Brilli

On a return visit to her hometown Brighton, prior to the 2012 Olympics, Brilli visited the Brighton Museum & Art Gallery, which she had made regular trips to since childhood and was an important element of her life: "the museum [was] an essential part of my life: for books, for inspiration, for humour, and for nostalgia". Influenced by the new ceramics display, on her return to London, she was inspired to design a ceramic figure, which combined the "humour of the Toby jug format" with the character of the then-Mayor of London, Boris Johnson, as the figure's subject matter. In 2012, to commemorate the UK's Olympic Games, she designed and made a humorous ceramic sculpture of the mayor riding his bike with the London Olympic emblem. After receiving the sculpture and a book illustrating the process of making the piece, Johnson sent both a handwritten and formal thank you letter.

== Photography ==
In 2015, Brilli moved to the Bay of Kotor and inspired by the dramatic and beautiful landscape purchased her first camera, a Nikon D7000. Her love of the Bay inspired her to photograph many overlooked villages, as well as, the iconic Perast islands. She has since published a book on Kotor Bay.

== Selected editorials ==
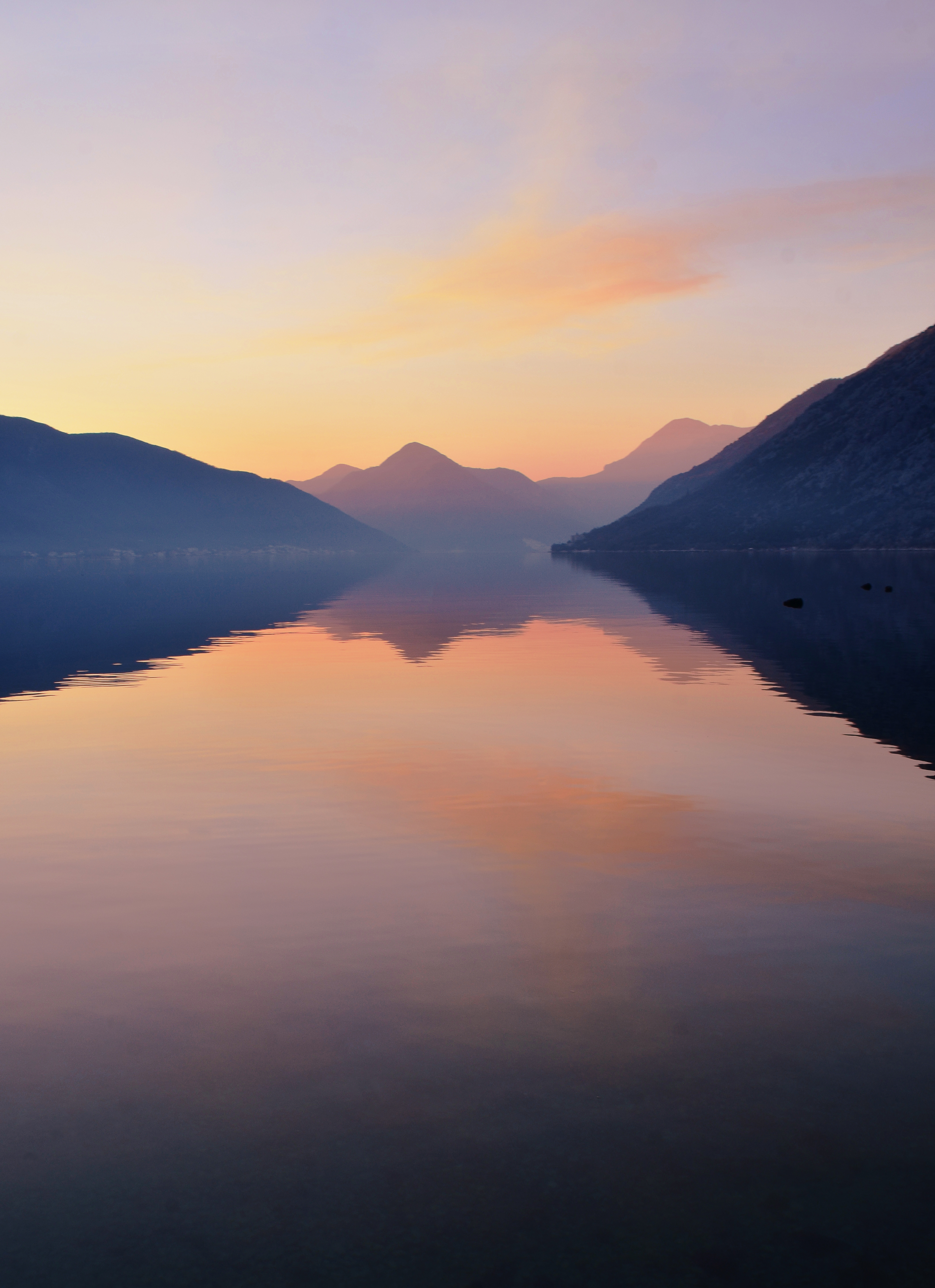
Sunset on Boka Kotorska Bay by Flavia Brilli

- Sunburst mirror, Cover, page. Homeflair Magazine. November 1995, Vol 5, Issue 10. ISSN 0959-0749
- Sunburst mirror pages 32–33. pg 35. Homeflair Magazine. November 1995, Issue 10. ISSN 0959-0749
- Emperor and Sun mirrors. pages 51– 54. Homeflair Magazine. May 1995. ISSN 0959-0749
- Violetta Mirror, pages 126. The London Magazine. January 1996. ISSN 1350-360X
- Wave Mirror, page 169. Elle Decoration. August 1996. ISSN 0957-8943
