= Central Bar jazz club =

Former jazz club in Clerkenwell, London

Coordinates: 51.52412°N 0.09586°W

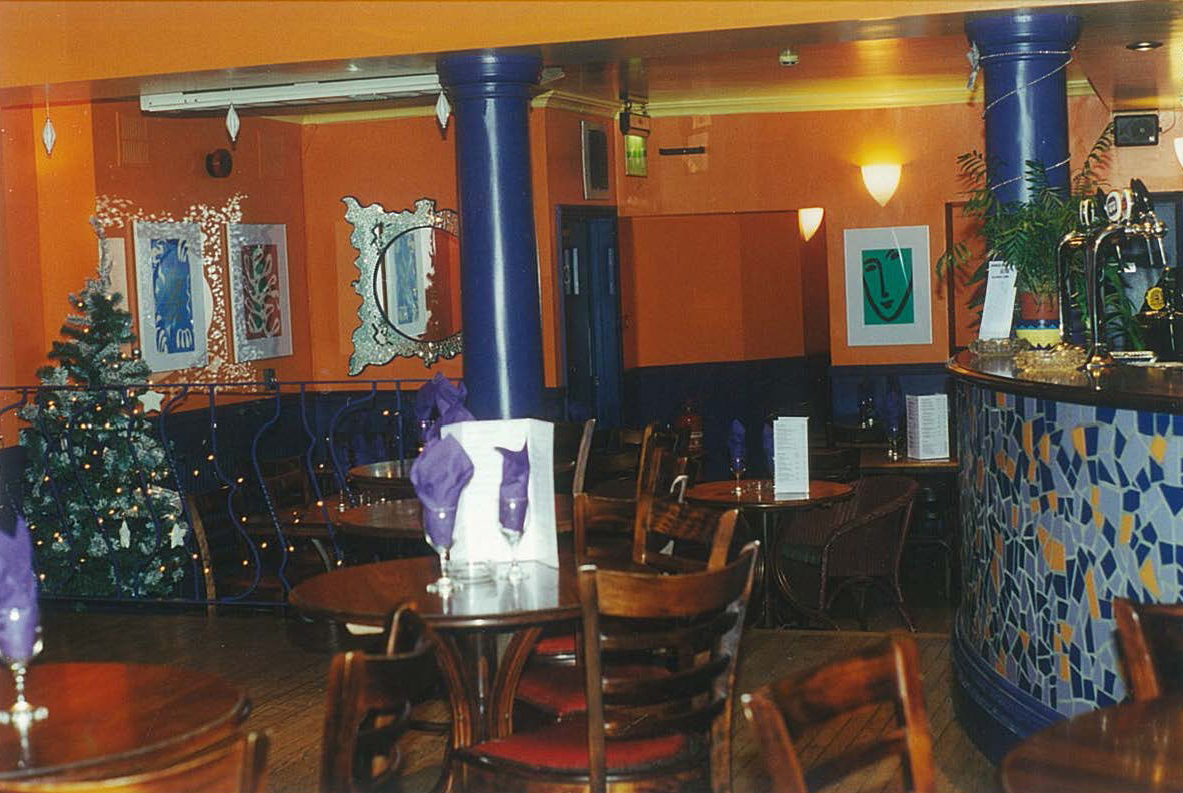
Interior of Central Bar jazz club

The Central Bar jazz club was a music venue in Clerkenwell, London, England. It was founded by booker and promoter Flavia Brilli in 1999.The club was located at 58 Old Street in Clerkenwell. It was situated on the first floor of the Central Bar which was used for various music nights and events until the promoter Flavia Brilli established the venue as a jazz club showcasing top British jazz musicians, visiting international players and young upcoming musicians.

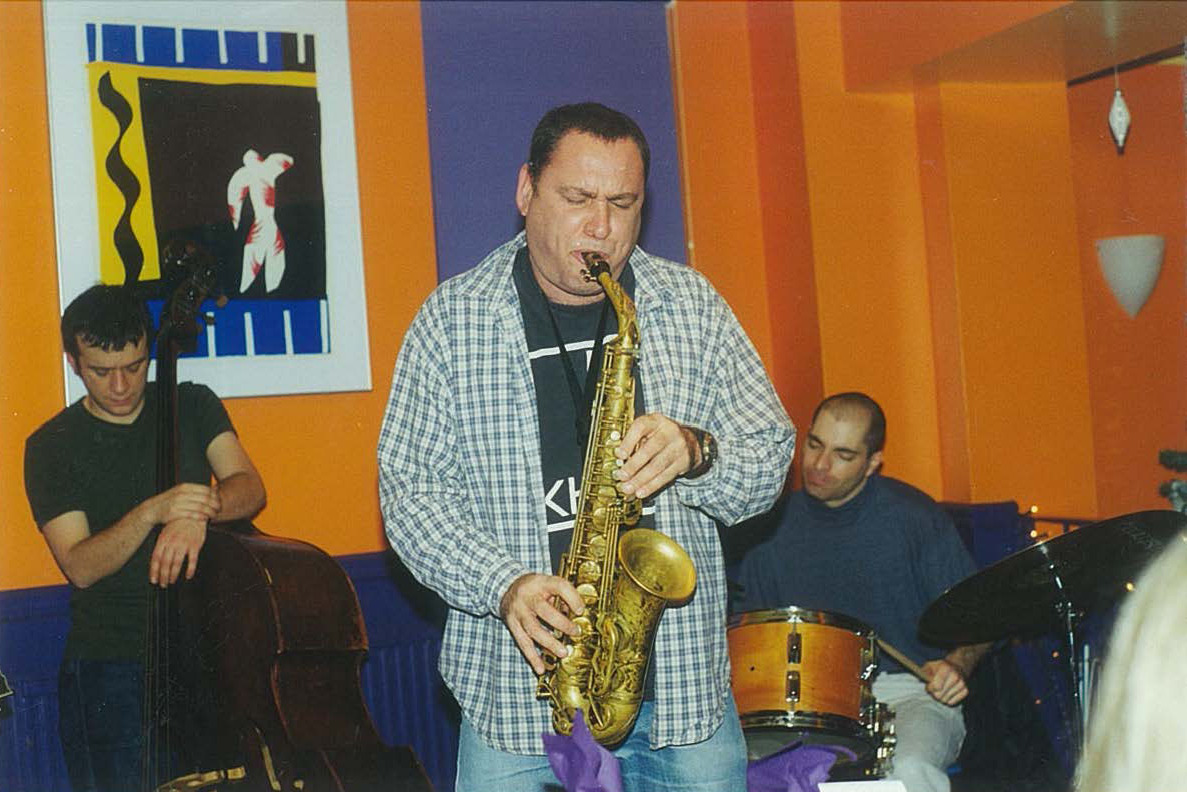
Saxophonist Gilad Atzmon performing at the Central Bar jazz club

Musicians who played at the club included Scottish jazz guitarist Jim Mullen (voted world's 5th best guitarist in 1982), Saxophonist Gilad Atzmon (who has recorded and performed with The Blockheads, Paul McCartney and Sinead O'Connor), English jazz trumpeter and composer Guy Barker (appointed Member of the Order of the British Empire (MBE) for services to jazz), acclaimed English alto saxophonist and clarinetist Peter King (who appeared on the soundtrack of the 1969 film The Italian Job and the film The Talented Mr. Ripley), American drummer Gene Calderazzo, English jazz drummer Martin Drew (who worked with Canadian virtuoso Oscar Peterson from 1974- 2007), British drummer and composer Seb Rochford (Mercury Prize Nominee), British saxophonist and composer Pete Wareham (Young Jazz Musician of the Year 1997), multi-award winning jazz saxophonist Alan Barnes, British saxophonist Martin Speake and award-winning English jazz composer and pianist Zoe Rahman.

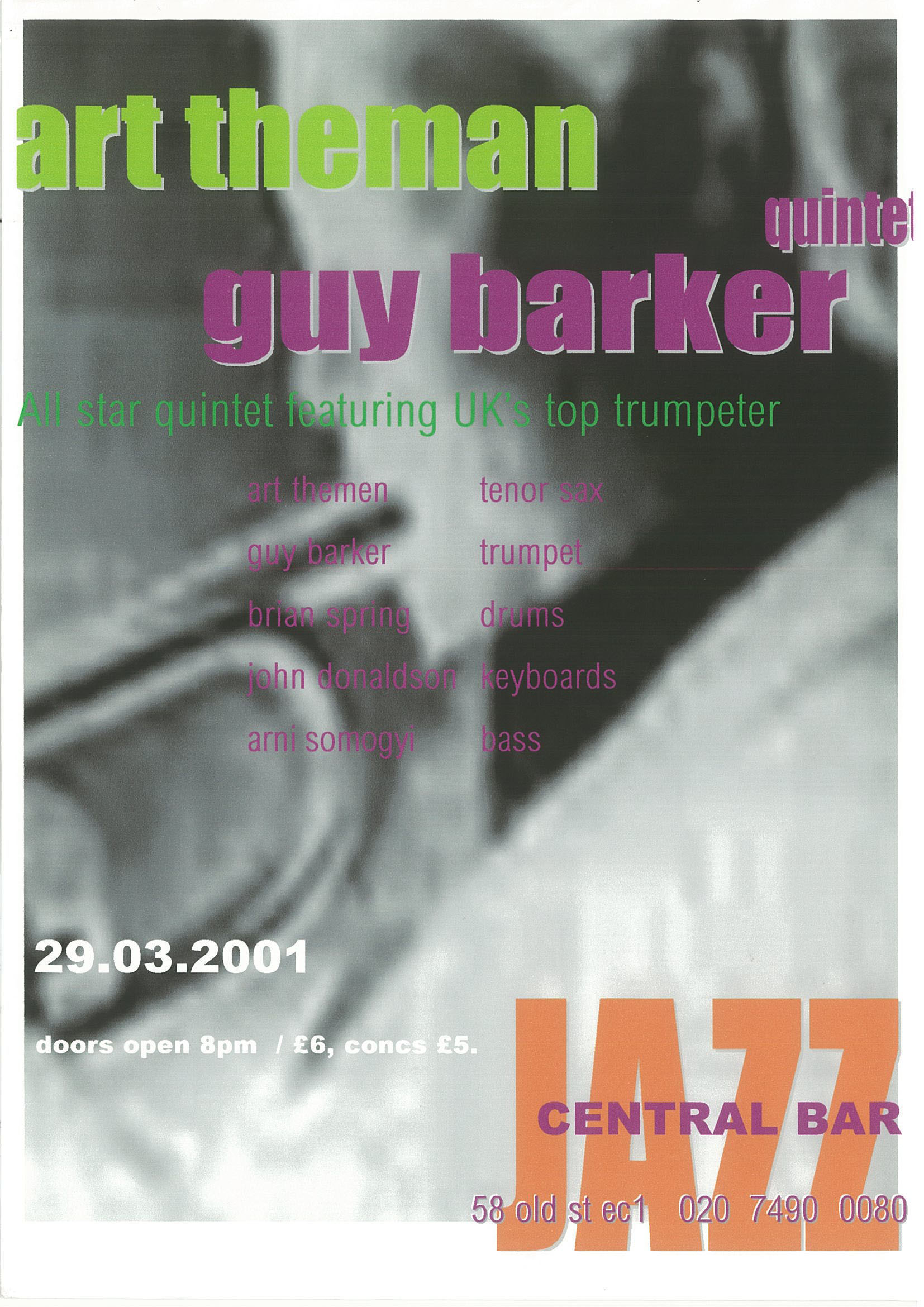

The club regularly appeared in listings and reviews in Time Out magazine, The Guardian newspaper, and the supplement of the London Evening Standard newspaper, Hot Tickets. London Evening Standard critic Jack Massarik was a regular visitor and reviewer of the venue and later wrote a letter praising Flavia Brilli's proficiency and programme choices.

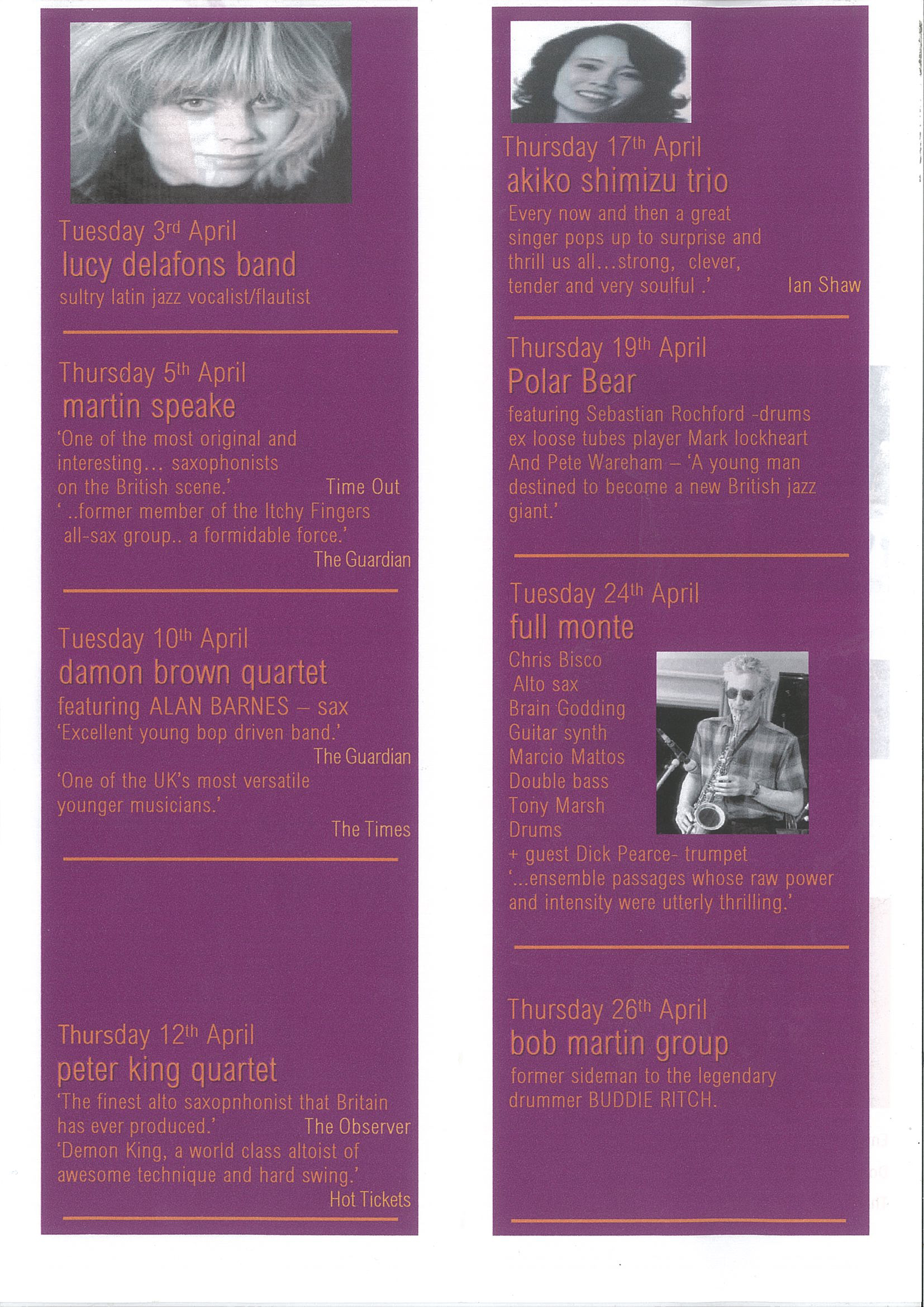
