= Ronnie Scott's Jazz Club =

Jazz club in Soho, London, England

Coordinates: 51.51346°N 0.13155°W

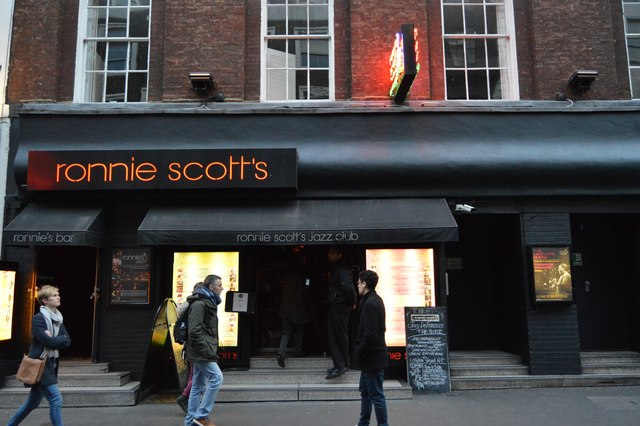
- Logo of Ronnie Scott's Jazz Club Ronnie Scott's in 2017
- Address: 47 Frith Street
- Location: Soho, London, United Kingdom
- Owner: Sally Greene and Michael Watt
- Type: Jazz club

Construction
- Opened: 1959; 67 years ago

Website
- ronniescotts.co.uk

Ronnie Scott's Jazz Club is a jazz club that has operated in Soho, London, since 1959.

== History ==
The club opened on 30 October 1959 in a basement at 39 Gerrard Street in London's Soho district. It was set up and managed by musicians Ronnie Scott and Pete King. In 1965 it moved to a larger venue nearby at 47 Frith Street. The original venue continued in operation as the "Old Place" until the lease ran out in 1967, and was used for performances by the up-and-coming generation of musicians.

Zoot Sims was the club's first transatlantic visitor in 1962, and was succeeded by many others (often saxophonists whom Scott and King, tenor saxophonists themselves, admired, such as Johnny Griffin, Lee Konitz, Sonny Rollins and Sonny Stitt) in the years that followed. Many UK jazz musicians were also regularly featured, including Tubby Hayes and Dick Morrissey who would both drop in for jam sessions with the visiting stars. In the mid-1960s, Ernest Ranglin was the house guitarist. The club's house pianist until 1967 was Stan Tracey. For nearly 30 years it was home of a Christmas residency to George Melly and John Chilton's Feetwarmers. In 1978, the club established the label Ronnie Scott's Jazz House, which issued both live performances from the club and new recordings. English electronic band Depeche Mode played their first live show under that name, having formerly been playing under the name 'Composition of Sound', at the club on 29 October 1980.

Scott regularly acted as the club's Master of Ceremonies, and was known for his repertoire of jokes, asides and one-liners. After Scott's death in 1996, King continued to run the club for a further nine years, before selling the club to theatre impresario Sally Greene and philanthropist Michael Watt in June 2005.

In 2009, Ronnie Scott's was named by the Brecon Jazz Festival as one of 12 venues that had made the most important contributions to jazz in the United Kingdom, and finished third in the voting for the initial award.

Jimi Hendrix's last public performance was at Ronnie Scott's, in 1970.

== House musicians ==
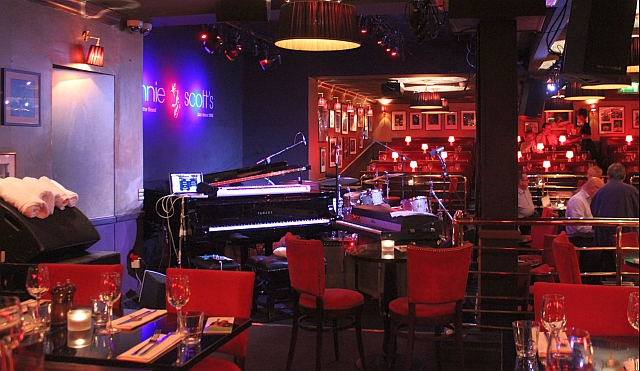
Club interior

Many of the visiting musicians appearing at Ronnie Scott's were soloists touring without their own rhythm section, or were touring as members of larger bands and they often used the house band to accompany them. On occasions, the house musicians coincided with the members of the various bands that Ronnie Scott led at one time or another.

=== Drums ===
- Phil Seamen – house drummer from 1964 to 1968
- Allan Ganley – house drummer from 1964 to 1967,

backing visiting Americans such as Stan Getz, Art Farmer and Roland Kirk

- Tony Oxley – house drummer from 1966 until the early 1970s.

Accompanied Joe Henderson, Lee Konitz, Charlie Mariano, Stan Getz, Sonny Rollins and Bill Evans.

- Martin Drew – house drummer from 1975 to 1995
- Mark Fletcher - house drummer from 1994 to 2006
- Chris Dagley – house drummer from 2006 to 2010
- Pedro Segundo – house drummer since 2010
- Chris Higginbottom – house drummer since 2012

=== Piano ===
- Eddie Thompson – house pianist 1959–60
- Stan Tracey – house pianist from March 1960 to 1967/1968
- John Critchinson – house pianist from 1978 to 1995.

Accompanied Chet Baker, George Coleman, James Moody, Joe Henderson and Johnny Griffin

- James Pearson – house pianist since 2006

=== Bass ===
- Sam Burgess – house bassist since 2006

=== Guitar ===
- Ernest Ranglin – house guitarist 1964–65.

=== Other musicians ===
Other regular performers since 2006 include:

- Al Cherry (guitar)
- Alan Barnes (saxophone)
- Alec Dankworth (bass)
- Alex Garnett (saxophone)
- Alistair White (trombone)
- Arnie Somogyi (bass)
- Dave O'Higgins (saxophone)
- Gary Baldwin (Hammond organ)
- Gerard Presencer (trumpet)
- James Nisbet (guitar)
- Mark Smith (bass)
- Matt Home (drums)
- Mornington Lockett
- Natalie Williams (vocals)
- Nina Ferro (vocals)
- Pete Long (saxophone)
- Ralph Salmins (drums)
- Steve Fishwick (trumpet)
- Steve Rushton (drums)

== Record label ==
In 1978, the club established its own record label, Ronnie Scott's Jazz House. The first release was an album by Scott's quintet. Over the next 20 years, the label gained in prominence, issuing both historic live club performances and new recordings.

== Birmingham offshoot ==
During the late 1950s through to the early 1960s, Ronnie Scott had played at various venues across Birmingham, including the Golden Cross in Aston. In October 1991, a short-lived and franchised offshoot was opened at 258 Broad Street. It hosted notable musicians and bands, such as Charlie Watts, Kenny Baker's Dozen, Robert Fripp, Scotty Moore, Helen Shapiro, and Coldplay, who held early concerts there during 1999 and 2000.

=== Closure and final concert at Ronnie Scott's – Birmingham ===
In July 2001, after declining footfall with mounting debts of £1.5m and a failed rescue deal, the club was gradually shut down by franchisee Allan Sartori. The final concert and shutdown ceremony featuring Satsangi was held at the club on 2 February 2002. The closure of Ronnie Scott's – Birmingham was subsequently reported in The Guardian. Allan Sartori claimed to have lost £800,000 on the venture and later died in July 2018 aged 68. As of 2024, 258 Broad Street was reported as being closed and unused.

== Live albums recorded at Ronnie's ==
- 1964/65: There and Back – The Dick Morrissey Quartet (released 1997). Recorded 27 January 1964/20 August 1965
- 1965: Sonny Stitt / Live at Ronnie Scott's – Sonny Stitt and the Dick Morrissey Quartet. Recorded May 1965
- 1966: Blossom Time at Ronnie Scott's – Blossom Dearie
- 1967: Sweet Blossom Dearie – Blossom Dearie
- 1972: Rich in London, aka Very Alive at Ronnie Scott's – Buddy Rich Big Band
- 1974: Ella in London – Ella Fitzgerald
- 1975: Lee Konitz Meets Warne Marsh Again - Lee Konitz and Warne Marsh
- 1976: Livestock - Brand X
- 1976: Symphony of Scorpions - Graham Collier
- 1977: Ronnie Scott's Presents Sarah Vaughan Live – Sarah Vaughan
- 1980: Live at Ronnie Scott's, aka The Man from Planet Jazz – Buddy Rich Big Band
- 1984: Live at Ronnie Scott's – Nina Simone. Recorded 17 November 1984.
- 1988: Live at Ronnie Scott's – Curtis Mayfield
- 1989: The London Concert – George Russell's Living Time Orchestra
- 1990: Live at Ronnie Scott's – Taj Mahal
- 1992: Fourth World: Recorded live at Ronnie Scott's Club
- 1994: Speed Trap – Peter King Quintet featuring Gerard Presencer
- 1995: How Long Has This Been Going On – Van Morrison, Georgie Fame and Pee Wee Ellis. Recorded 3 May 1995.
- 1995: A Change of Seasons – Dream Theater
- 2003: Live at Ronnie Scott's - Lisa Stansfield
- 2006: Live at Ronnie Scott's – Jamie Cullum
- 2007: Live at Ronnie Scott's – Jeff Beck

== See also ==
- Ronnie Scott
- Thomas Gould (violinist)
- List of jazz clubs
- Archer Street
