= Michael Watt (philanthropist) =

New Zealand entrepreneur and philanthropist (born 1940)

Michael Watt ONZM
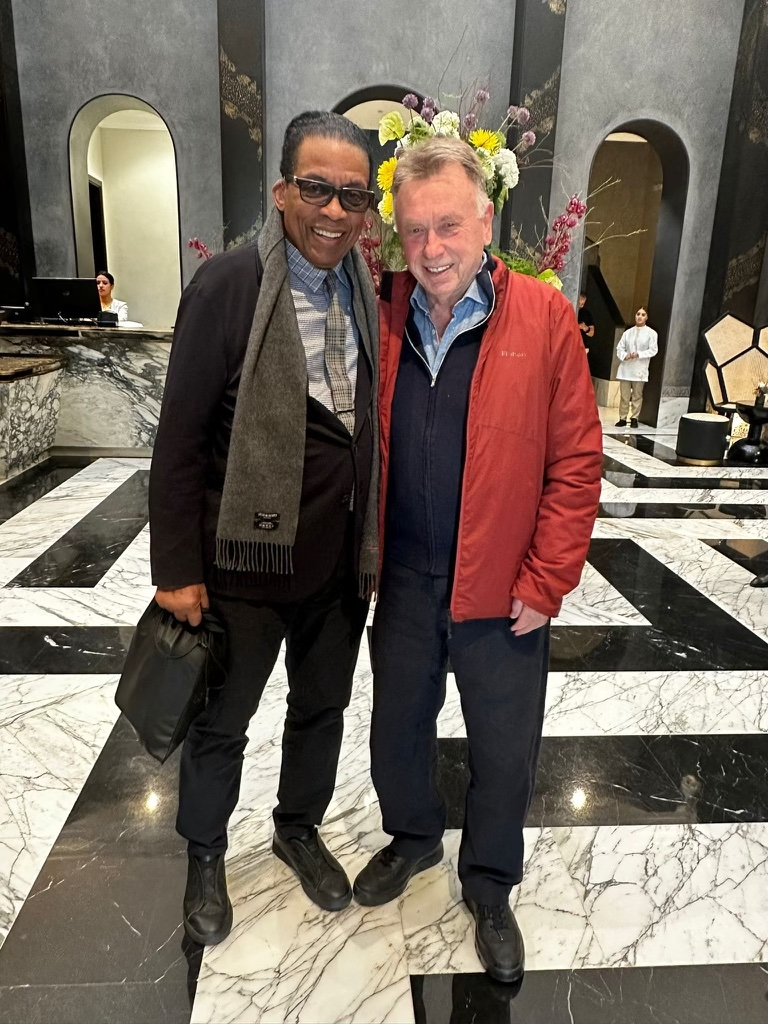
- Watt with Herbie Hancock at the UNESCO International Jazz Day in Tangier
- Born: Michael Heseltine Watt; 16 December 1940 (age 85); Christchurch, New Zealand
- Occupations: Entrepreneur, philanthropist and investor

Michael Heseltine Watt ONZM (born 16 December 1940) is a New Zealand entrepreneur, philanthropist, and investor. He was appointed an Officer of the New Zealand Order of Merit for services to the community in the 2005 New Year Honours.

== Early life ==
Born in Christchurch, New Zealand, Watt was expelled from Christ's College, Christchurch, in 1955 and spent the next 10 years working in various blue-collar industries, including oil exploration and construction.

== Oil industry ==
In the 1960s, Watt worked as an explosives expert for oil exploration crews in North Africa, the Middle East, and Central America. In the late 1960s/early 1970s, he worked for the National Supply Company oilfield division of Armco Steel, out of Houston, Texas, and Louisiana, on the early development of sub-sea wellheads and blow-out preventers. During this period, he became a partner of Drexel Oil Services in Aberdeen, Scotland. After a project with the Israeli Government off the Sinai Peninsula, Watt sold out of all his oil interests in 1976.

== Sports ==
During the 1980s, Michael Watt engaged in personal client management, including individuals such as Formula One driver Alan Jones and cricketer Imran Khan.

While working with Capital Sports New York, he formed CSI in London and quickly saw an opportunity where sports bodies worldwide were not exploiting their international television rights intelligently, and in a pioneering move soon represented all soccer bodies in UK/Europe, as well as all international rugby, cricket federations and the 1980 Winter Olympics. CSI's largest publicised contract was a deal with NewsCorp in the lead up to the 1995 Rugby World Cup in South Africa, which led to the professionalism of the international Rugby Union, particularly in the southern hemisphere. Worth approximately $950m, this was largest sports broadcasting contract in history at the time. CSI represented all cricket and rugby federations, and most soccer federations, for 15 years. Their work is largely credited with shaping the current professionalism of most major sporting industries.

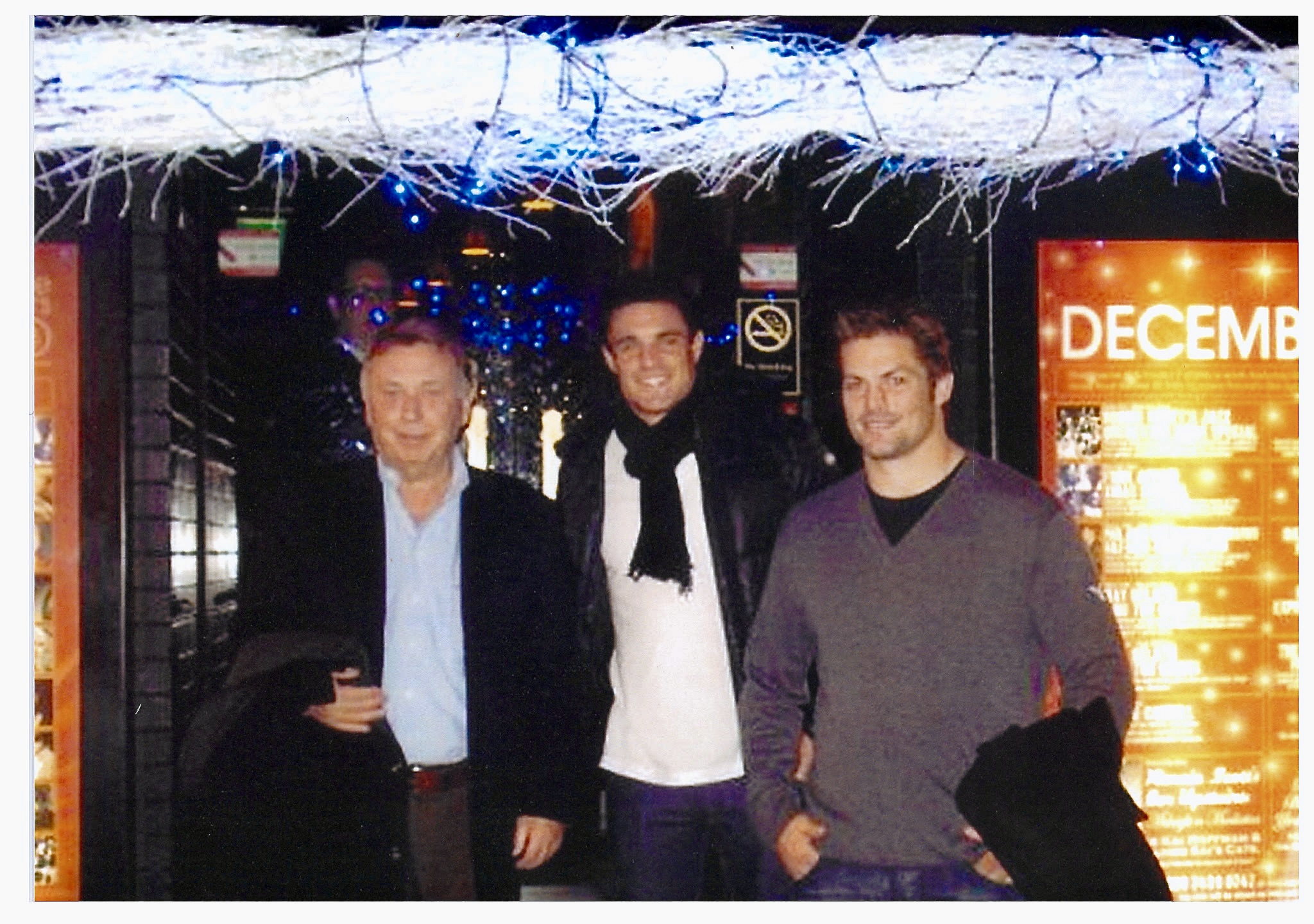
Watt with Dan Carter and Richie McCaw at Ronnie Scott's

Watt was also an cornerstone investor in Cricinfo in August 1999.

In 2000, he donated to Brisbane-based Brothers Rugby Club "saving them from collapse", and subsequently is referred to as "club savior".

CSI was sold to the Interpublic Group in 2001.

Watt was also a partner in NRL club the Melbourne Storm, with Bart Campbell, Matt Tripp and Gerry Ryan.

Watt was a cornerstone investor in Setanta Sports (now Premier Sports) in 2009.

In 2014, Watt joined former All Black rugby captain Richie McCaw, Simon Apperley and Ben Dormer as partners of the SOL Group

== Music ==
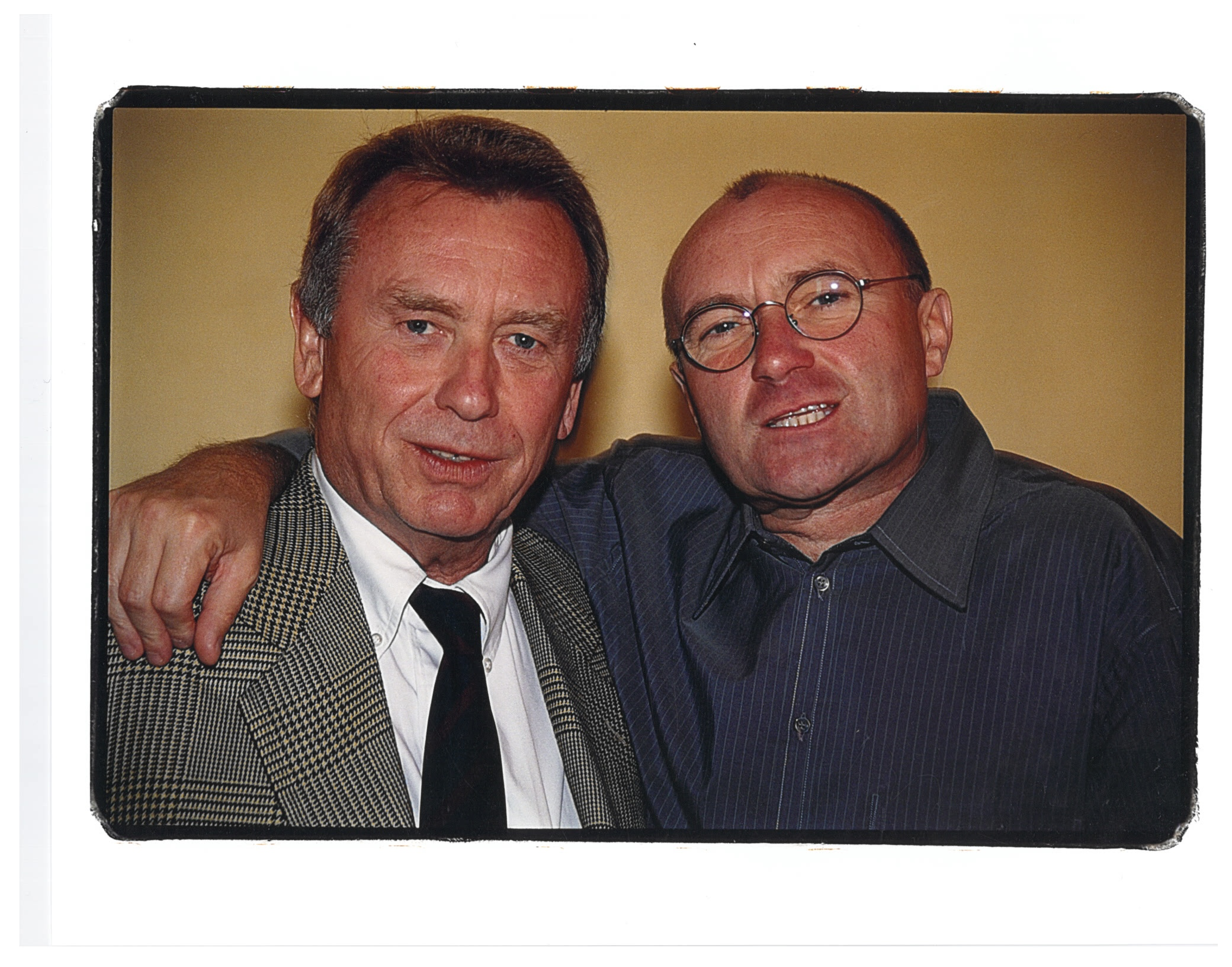
Watt with Phil Collins.

Watt produced numerous albums since the 1990s, most notably Vince Mendoza's Grammy-nominated Epiphany in 1999, which is considered a classic by many in the jazz music industry including Bill Laurance of Snarky Puppy, John Beasley and The Juilliard School of Music.

Watt was producer and promoter in the entertainment industry, including Michael Jackson's History Tour and Riverdance The Musical.

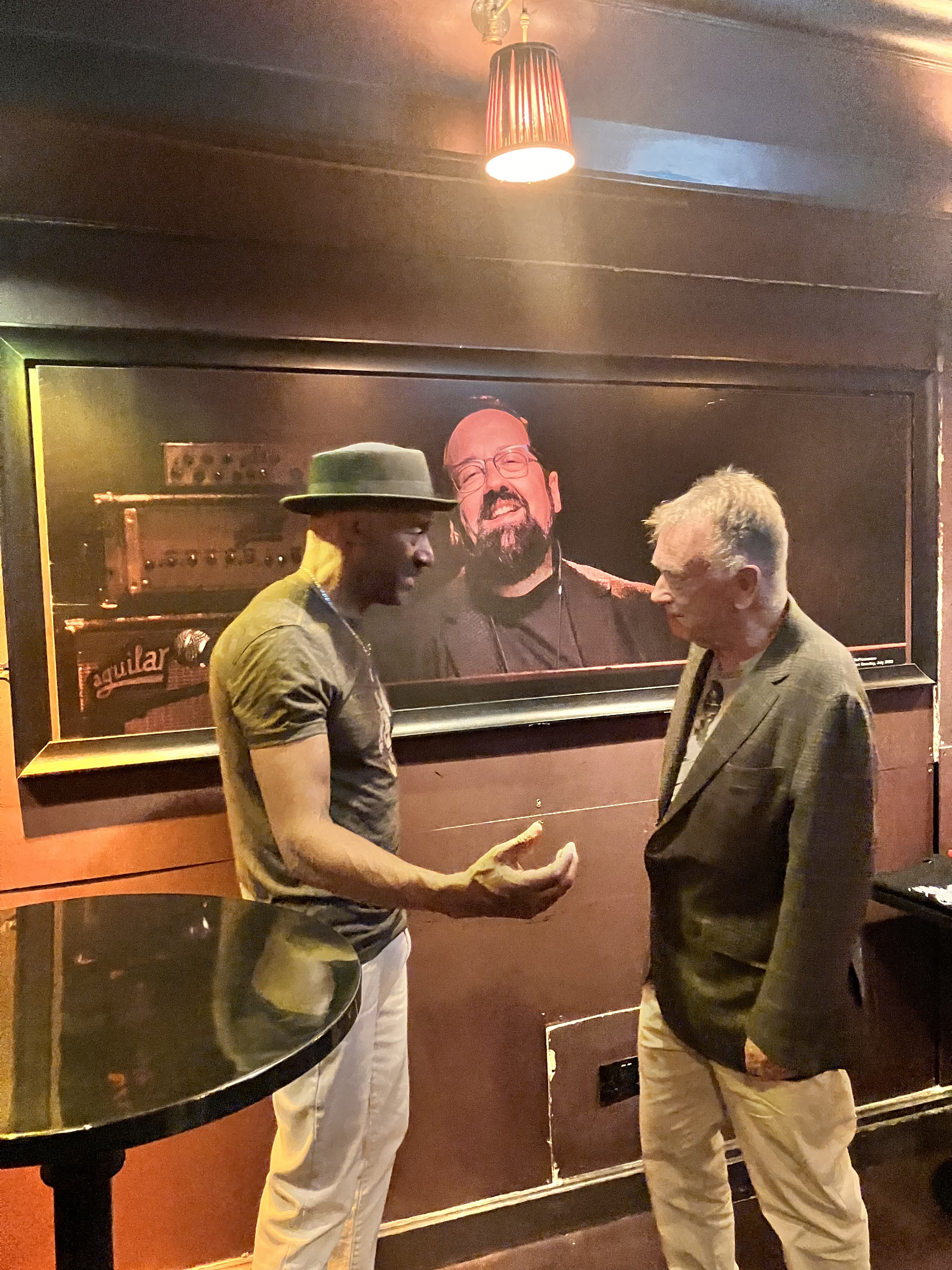
Watt with Marcus Miller at Ronnie Scott's, London

Watt was an executive producer on a number of musical albums for artists including Herbie Hancock, Bill Laurance, Vince Mendoza, Ian Shaw and the Sonoran-based minimalist Jeff Greinke. In 2009 Watt joined music mogul Korda Marshall in relaunching the Infectious Music record label (formerly known as Infectious Records). The label's most notable signing was alt-J, who won the 2012 British Barclaycard Mercury Prize for their debut album An Awesome Wave, which reached Platinum certification in the UK. Their other signings include General Fiasco, Local Natives, Cloud Control, Drenge, Superfood, RY X, The Acid, These New Puritans, and Vance Joy. Infectious Music was acquired by BMG Rights Management in September 2014.

According to Janine Irons OBE, in 2020 Watt became the main individual sponsor of the Tomorrow's Warriors. This programme, founded in 1991, champions diversity, inclusion and equality across the arts through jazz, with a special focus on "Black musicians, female musicians and those whose financial or other circumstances might lock them out of opportunities to pursue a career in the music industry"

Watt is also the owner of the legendary Ronnie Scott's Jazz Club in Soho, London, with business partner Sally Greene OBE.

== Theatre ==
Watt has had an extensive history in the theatre industry, and is the only New Zealander to receive Tony Award's for Annie Get Your Gun, Gypsy and Catch Me If You Can and has also received multiple Tony Award nominations.

His current theatre production credits include:

- The Bodyguard
- Moulin Rouge
- Chicago
- Sinatra: The Musical

His previous notable theatre production credits include:

- Jersey Boys
- Matilda the Musical
- We Will Rock You
- The Boy from Oz
- Company
- Death of a Salesman

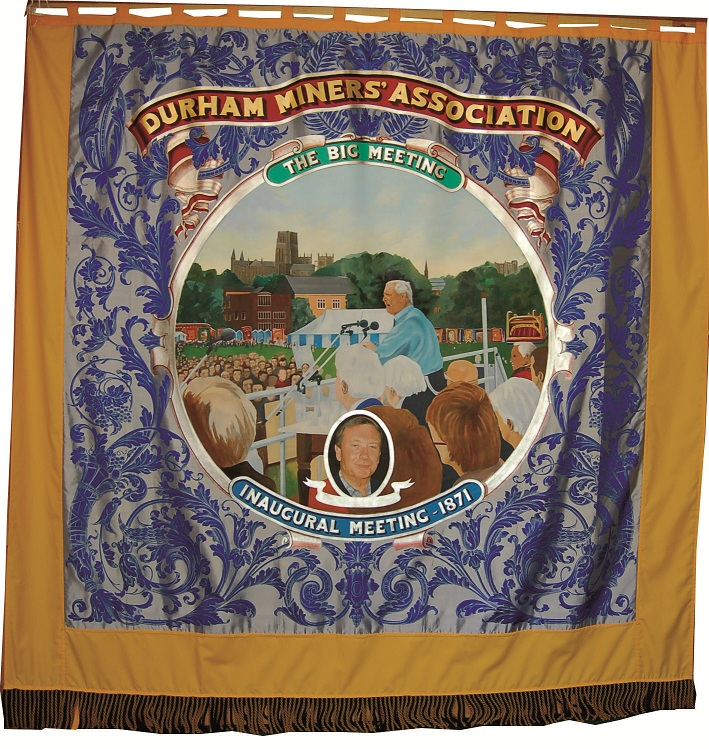
One of the Durham Miners' Association's banners, which features Anthony Wedgwood Benn, as well as Watt

== Philanthropy ==
Watt has dedicated much of his later life to philanthropic endeavours around the globe. Earlier endeavours include sponsoring the Durham Miners' Gala for 10 years when it was on the brink of collapse in the late 1990s. His UK domestic work also includes supporting the Easington Colliery Band, as well as many other music-based non-profits including The Sixteen, the National Youth Jazz Orchestra, and across the Atlantic the Jazz Foundation of America. By forming the Ronnie Scott's Charitable Foundation in 2015, Watt is continuing to support major musical charities across the UK and provide free instruments to disadvantaged youths.

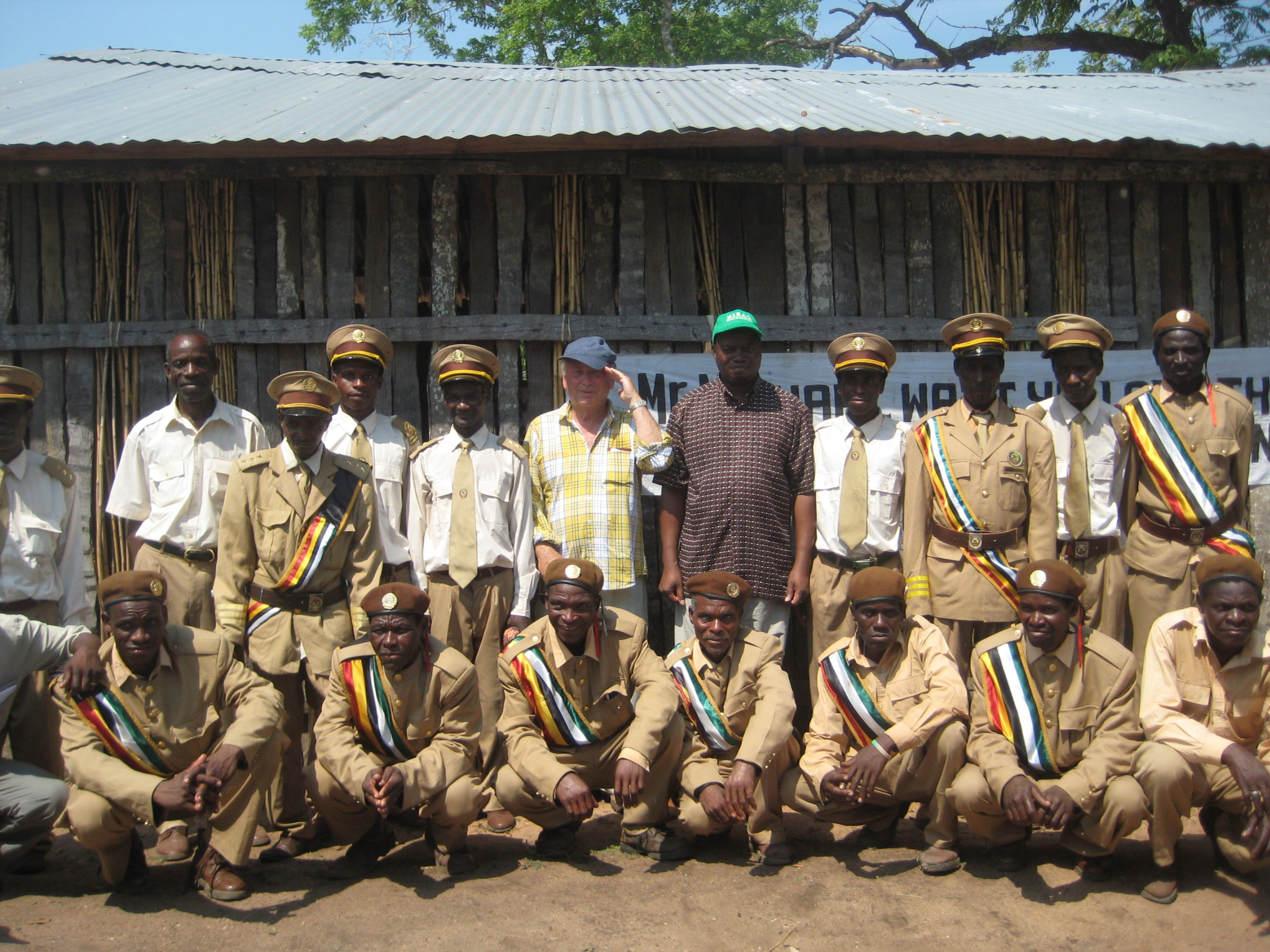
Welcoming committee of Chupanga with Watt

His efforts expanded to internationally to include numerous projects in Mozambique, such as agricultural and sustainability developments in the northern village of Chupanga, a school for the blind in Beira, as well as the purchase and conversion of a disused prison on the outskirts of Beira into a women's safe space. He also funded with Concern Worldwide the development of another safe space for women and children in Bangladesh, as well as a state of the art paediatric dental clinic in a refugee camp in Amman, Jordan. In Cuba, he has developed schools and community projects, as well as providing Cuban hospitals with much needed supplies. In South Africa, Watt also provided additional sponsorship of a music school in Daveyton.

His love of sports has seen him develop cricket facilities in townships of South Africa, while back in his native New Zealand he funded the development of the Hadlee Watt Academy and the Bert Sutcliffe Oval at Lincoln University in Christchurch.

In recent years, Watt has shifted his focus towards the refugee crises in the Middle East and Africa, and in particular he has supported projects by Concern Worldwide to deliver emergency aid kits to thousands of internally displaced persons in Northern Syria, provide aid to Syrian refugees in Northern Lebanon, and help Sierra Leone recover after the Ebola crisis. He is also the primary donor for Salam LADC, a grassroots NGO that provides aid to the approximately 500,000 Syrian and Palestinian refugees in the Bekaa Valley of Lebanon.

In 2000, Watt donated to Brisbane-based Brothers Rugby Club "saving them from collapse", and subsequently is referred to as "club savior".

In 2003, he made a significant donation to the New Zealand Special Olympics, which sponsored the event. He also donated to the Hohepa Trust based in New Zealand, which cares for the intellectually disabled.

Watt has supported various projects with his friend Jane Goodall over the years.

In March 2026, Watt was announced by Tomorrow's Warriors as one of the charity's inaugural patrons, the others being Baroness Amos, Margaret Busby, Guy Chambers, Robert Elms, Nick Hornby, Lizzie Ridding and John Ridding, Richard Wyatt, Femi Koleoso, Eska and Moses Boyd.
