= Sally Greene =

British entrepreneur, theatre impresario, restaurateur and philanthropist

Sally Greene OBE
- Education: Guildhall School of Music and Drama
- Occupations: Producer, restaurateur
- Website: sallygreeneobe.com

Sally Greene OBE is a British entrepreneur, theatre impresario, restaurateur and philanthropist. She is known for her work in theatre and entertainment, which includes the Old Vic and Criterion theatres in London's West End, as well Ronnie Scott's Jazz Club. Greene also co-produced Billy Elliot the Musical with Stephen Daldry and has worked as executive producer for multiple theatre, film and television projects through her production company Greene Light Stage.

In 2006, Greene was appointed an OBE for services to drama.

== Early life and education ==
Greene is the daughter of lawyer and amateur playwright Basil Greene. She initially trained as an actress, before moving backstage as a stage manager. Greene also wrote a theatre column for Tatler in the 1980s.

Greene attended the Guildhall School of Music and Drama.

== Career ==
Greene's career in theatre began with the restoration of the Richmond Theatre. She bought the lease in 1987 before renegotiating it into a charitable trust with the local authority funding the restoration of the building.

In 1992, Greene set up the Criterion Trust on a similar business plan, after which the theatre went under a complete restoration.

In 1998, the Old Vic Theatre which is among Britain's oldest theatres, was in talks for development as an alternative venue, with speculation that it might become a nightclub or bingo hall, leading to an appeal by Culture Secretary Chris Smith.

Greene was instrumental in forming the Old Vic Theatre Trust 2000, which enlisted figures like Alex Bernstein and Stephen Daldry. The trust bought the building, offering an initial payment of £1.5 million, which was later supplemented by a further £2 million to transfer the ownership from the previous owner, Ed Mirvish, into the charitable trust. In 1994, Greene founded Greene Light Stage which she runs alongside CEO and producer Rebecca Quigley. The company has been involved in over 100 shows including Billy Elliott the Musical with Stephen Daldry. The show first performed at the Victoria Palace Theatre in 2005. In 2007 she launched Greene Light Films, which produces films and short films and made its first venture into television production in 2019.

Greene owns prominent jazz venue Ronnie Scott's Jazz Club in Soho. Together with philanthropist Michael Watt, she took over from Pete King in 2005, and facilitated a complete refurbishment.

Greene also owns No. Fifty Cheyne, opened in 2004 as the Cheyne Walk Brasserie in Chelsea and relaunched in 2019 under the new name.

Greene was a Founding Trustee of the Old Vic Theatre Trust 2000 and holds trustee and director positions at the Criterion Theatre Trust, Greene Light Stage and Ronnie Scott's Charitable Foundation.

== Work ==
=== Theatre ===
- Billy Elliot: The Musical (producer)

=== Film ===
- 2007 Ruby Blue (executive producer)
- 2011 Hunky Dory (executive producer)
- 2014 Desert Dancer (executive producer)

=== Television ===
Planned adaptation of the life of Joan and Jackie Collins (executive producer).
