= Speed Trap =

Live album by Peter King
- Released: April 23, 1996
- Recorded: September 1994
- Genre: Jazz
- Length: 74:19
- Label: Jazz House
- Producer: Chris Lewis, Peter King

Peter King chronology
Tamburello (1994)	Speed Trap (1996)	Lush Life (1998)

Professional ratings
Review scores
Source	Rating
The Penguin Guide to Jazz Recordings	3/4 stars
Musicweb International	(?)

Speed Trap is a live jazz album by Peter King, recorded at Ronnie Scott's Jazz Club (Frith Street, London) in September 1994, and released in 1996 under the Ronnie Scotts Jazz House label. It features British/Canadian trumpet player Gerard Presencer who is now head of Jazz at the Royal Academy of Music.

== Track listing ==
1. "Mr. Silver" (Sylvain Beuf) – 13:48
2. "My Man's Gone Now" (George Gershwin, Ira Gershwin, DuBose Heyward) – 15:37
3. "T.N.K." (unknown) – 12:40
4. "Naima" (John Coltrane) – 10:10
5. "Speed Trap" (King) – 12:06
6. "Getting On" (King) – 9:48

== Personnel ==
- Peter King – alto saxophone, soprano saxophone
- Gerard Presencer – trumpet
- Steve Melling – piano
- Alec Dankworth – bass
- Stephen Keogh – drums
