= Joy Marshall (singer) =

- Born: Jean Pipkins; United States
- Died: London, England
- Genres: Jazz, pop
- Occupation: Singer
- Instrument: Voice
- Labels: Ember Records International, Decca, Toast, Turtle
- Member of: The Johnny Dankworth band
- Spouse: Peter King
- Partner: Tubby Hayes

Joy Marshall was an English based American jazz singer who performed in clubs and venues around the United States, England and the Netherlands. She recorded for the Ember, Decca and Toast labels. She had a national UK hit during the 1960s.

== Background ==
Joy Marshall was born in New York and started out singing in church. It was in the 1950s that she was a navy singer, performing in a big band. After her discharge from the navy, she performed in clubs and got steady work. She was unable to get a recording contract while other singers did. One night she was at the Purple Onion club in San Franscisco. There, Royston Marker who was an executive from New Zealand talked her into moving to England where he said she would do better.

Joy Marshall's move to England achieved two things. She replaced Cleo Laine in the Johnny Dankworth band. She became one England's top local jazz artists. She also got married.

Marshall married Peter King at the Westminster Registry Office at the Marylebone Town Hall in London, on 29th October 1962. The marriage has been described as being tempestuous. Marshall would end up in a relationship with Tubby Hayes.

According to the 14 March 1964 issue of the Liverpool Echo, Marshall was aged 21 when she came to England eighteen months prior.

According to Val Wilmer who saw Marshall and Blossom Dearie perform at Ronnie Scott's club, Marshall had issues with audiences. Even though Marshall had a slight resemblance to Sarah Vaughan there were unfair comparisons between herself and Vaughan.

While living in England Marshall experienced problems with discrimination. Like Selena Jones and Madeline Bell, she experienced discrimination from landlords or prospective landlords.

== Career ==
=== 1962 to 1965 ===
Marshall recorded the song "Love Can Change So Many Things". Backed with "Till the End of Time", it was released on Ember EMBS 163 in 1962. She was backed by the Ronnie Howard Orchestra on the recordings. The single was reviewed by Don Nicoll in the 15 September issue of Disc. Her picture was also included at the top of the page. Giving the record three stars, Nicholl said that she had a fine romantic voice. He said that she should reach a few charts with the song.

In Early 1964, Marshall did a week at Ronnie Scott's club where she was backed by the Stan Tracey Trio. According to Melody Maker, she combined good material with a punchy attack and excellent diction. This may have been why the writer used her as an example because in the article it said that American artists seemed to have greater confidence and ability in projecting lyrics than their British counterparts displayed.

The results for the 1963 Melody Maker Readers Jazz Poll were published in the 1 February 1964 issue of Melody Maker. Marshall came no. 4 in the Female Singer category.

Also in 1964, Marshall played the part of street walker Maureen O'Neill in the musical, Maggie May. In spite of having three duets with the star Rachel Roberts, Marshall pulled out because she had no solo spots. She was replaced by Diana Quiseekay in August 1964.

In 1965, her solo album, Who Says They Don't Write Good Songs Anymore was released on Decca. She was also in the Netherlands that year. Backed by Rob Madna on piano and the Frans de Kok Orchestra she performed the song "It's All Right with Me".

=== 1966 to 1968 ===
In 1966, Marshall had a Top 40 hit in the UK with "The More I See You", Debuting on 23 June at no 34 its peak position, it spent one more week in the chart, exiting at no. 48. It also made the Singapore Top Ten. As shown by Billboard in the magazine's 9 July issue, the single made its debut at no. 9. On the week of 23 July (week 3) it had moved from no. 7 to no. 4.

On 30 July 1966, Marshall along with Dave Cash, Jackie Stewart and Susan Hampshire was a panelist on BBC's Juke Box Jury which was hosted by David Jacobs.

=== Final single release ===
In 1968, Marshall recorded the song "And I'll Find You" which was composed by Brian Potter and Graham Dee. It was arranged by Graham Wadsworth. It was originally intended to be a Eurovision Entry song for Sharon Tandy, but it didn't end up being so. Backed with "I'm So Glad You're Back", it was released on Toast TT 512. Joy Marshall was happy with the record. However, she died on or around 21 November and before the single was released. Her label Major Minor Records made the decision to go ahead with the release. According to the 30 November 1968 issue of Melody Maker, Marshall's parents who were in the UK at the time had heard the record and wanted Major Minor to go ahead with the release. The spokesman for the record label said that they would be doubling the royalties which would be paid to her parents.

The record was reviewed by Peter Jones in the 4 January 1969 issue of Record Mirror and possibly unaware of Marshall's death. It was given a four-star rating. Jones enjoyed listening to it and said it was a very good performance as expected, but the song might not be quite direct enough to click.

== In popular media ==
She can be seen performing (Won't You Come Home) Bill Bailey in the 1964 film London in the Raw.

== Death ==
Marshall was found dead in her London apartment on 21 November at the age of 32. Her death was said to be as a result from an overdose of sleeping pills and alcohol.

== Later years ==
Thirteen songs that Marshall recorded with the Gordon Beck Quartet in 1968 appeared on the When Sunny Gets Blue (Spring '68 Sessions) album. Credited to The Gordon Beck Quartet featuring Joy Marshall, it was released on Turtle TUR502 in 2018. her song "Heartache Hurry on By" was included on the 2020 various artists compilation, Don't Blow Your Cool! More '60s Girls from U.K. Decca.

== Discography ==
Singles
Act	Release	Catalogue	Year	Notes
Joy Marshall	"Love Can Change So Many Things" / "Till the End of Time"	Ember Records International EMB S163	1962	
Joy Marshall	"When You Hold Me Tight (Carlos' Theme)" / "Rain on Snow"	Decca F.11863	1964	
Joy Marshall	"Heartache Hurry on by" / "He's for Me"	Decca F.12189	1965	
Joy Marshall	"My Love Come Home" / "When a Girl Really Loves You"	Decca F.12222	1965	
Joy Marshall	"The More I See You" / "A Taste of Honey"	Decca – F.12422	1966	
Joy Marshall	"And I'll Find You" / "I'm So Glad You're Back"	Toast TT 512	1968	
Lenny Vestel Joy Marshall	"It's Paradise" / "Heartaches Hurry on By"	Stardust Records – URS 082	?	Lenny Vestel side A Joy Marshall side B

Albums
Act	Release	Catalogue	Year	Notes
Joy Marshall	Who Says They Don't Write Good Songs Anymore	Decca LK 4678	1965	
Gordon Beck Quartet featuring Joy Marshall	When Sunny Gets Blue (Spring '68 Sessions)	Turtle Records TUR502	2018	

Various artists appearances - EPs
Title	Tracks	Catalogue	Year	Notes
Hits Vol.4	A1. "Elusive Butterfly" A2. "The Pied Piper"; B1. "Mama" B2. "The More I See You"	Decca DFE-R 8662	1962	A1. Val Doonican, A2. Crispian St. Peters; B1. Dave Berry, B2. Joy Marshall
