= The Cook, the Thief, His Wife & Her Lover =

1989 film by Peter Greenaway

- Theatrical release poster
- Directed by: Peter Greenaway
- Written by: Peter Greenaway
- Produced by: Pascale Dauman; Kees Kasander; Daniel Toscan du Plantier; Denis Wigman
- Starring: Richard Bohringer; Michael Gambon; Helen Mirren; Alan Howard
- Cinematography: Sacha Vierny
- Edited by: John Wilson
- Music by: Michael Nyman
- Production companies: Allarts; Elsevier-Vendex
- Distributed by: Palace Pictures (United Kingdom); Pari Films (France)
- Release dates: 11 September 1989 (TIFF); 13 October 1989 (UK); 1 November 1989 (France); 6 April 1990 (United States)
- Running time: 124 minutes
- Countries: United Kingdom; France
- Language: English
- Box office: $7.7 million (North America)

The Cook, the Thief, His Wife & Her Lover is a 1989 crime drama art film written and directed by Peter Greenaway, starring Richard Bohringer, Michael Gambon, Helen Mirren and Alan Howard in the title roles. An international co-production of the United Kingdom and France, the film's graphic violence and nude scenes, as well as its lavish cinematography and formalism, were noted at the time of its release.

== Plot ==
English gangster Albert Spica has taken over the high-class Le Hollandais restaurant managed by French chef Richard Boarst. Spica makes nightly appearances at the restaurant with his retinue of thugs. His oafish behaviour causes frequent confrontations with the staff and other diners, whose patronage he loses but whose money he seems not to miss.

Forced to accompany Spica is his reluctant yet elegant wife, Georgina, who soon catches the eye of a quiet regular at the restaurant: bookshop owner Michael. Under her husband's nose, with the help of the restaurant staff, Georgina carries on an affair with Michael.

Spica soon learns of the affair, forcing Georgina and Michael to hide at the book depository where Michael works a side job. Borst sends food to them through Pup, a boy soprano who sings while working. Spica tortures Pup before finding the book depository's location written in a book the boy is carrying. Spica's men raid the book depository while Georgina is visiting Pup in the hospital; they torture Michael to death by force-feeding him pages from his books. Georgina discovers his body when she returns.

Overcome with rage and grief, Georgina begs Boarst to cook Michael's body, and he eventually complies after Georgina clarifies it is for Spica. At the restaurant, a false invitation was sent to Spica. Together with all the people that Spica wronged throughout the film, Georgina confronts her husband, revealing a whole roast of Michael. Spica retaliates with a pistol but is disarmed immediately. Georgina forces him at gunpoint to eat a mouthful of Michael's cooked body. Spica obeys, gagging. Georgina then shoots him in the head, calling him a cannibal.

== Cast ==
- Richard Bohringer as Richard Boarst, "The Cook": The head chef of "Le Hollandais". He resents Albert Spica, who has taken control of the restaurant.
- Michael Gambon as Albert Spica, "The Thief": A violent gangster and owner of "Le Hollandais", with pretensions of being a gourmet, but his coarse and violent behaviour wreaks destruction on everyone around him.
- Helen Mirren as Georgina Spica, "His Wife": The sophisticated and battered wife of Albert Spica, from whom she has unsuccessfully tried to escape.
- Alan Howard as Michael, "Her Lover": An erudite bookshop owner who dines at "Le Hollandais" every night while reading a book. He carries on a doomed affair with Georgina.
- Tim Roth as Mitchel, a dangerous, erratic, psychopathic innocent. He's always eager to please and impress Albert and maybe is related to him – perhaps Spica is Mitchel's uncle. Albert uses and abuses Mitchel who always remains loyal to him. Albert, without acknowledging it openly, feels drawn to Mitchel – maybe it's thwarted fatherhood or maybe it's a sexual attraction."
- Ciarán Hinds as Cory, a pony-tailed pimp who is ejected from Spica's gang after he protests against Spica's brutal treatment of his girls.
- Gary Olsen as Spangler, a brutal member of Spica's gang.
- Ewan Stewart as Harris, a less brutal member of Spica's gang.
- Roger Ashton-Griffiths as Turpin, the bespectacled bookkeeper in Spica's gang.
- Liz Smith as Grace, Georgina's mother, a blousy woman of 65 - overdressed, over made-up, brassy and very sycophantic to Albert to whom, through Georgina, she owes everything."
- Ian Dury as Terry Fitch, in a rare acting appearance, as a rival gangster.
- Diane Langton as May Fitch, Terry's wife.
- Paul Russell as Pup, a kitchen boy soprano at "Le Hollandais" who sings "The Miserere" (music by Michael Nyman, after Psalm 51), while washing dishes. Later, he brings food to Georgina and Michael while they are hiding from Albert at the book depository where Michael works a side "stock-taking job" when his book store is slow.
- Emer Gillespie as Patricia, one of Cory's luckless girls who tells Spica about his wife's affair.
- Ron Cook as Mews, a bespectacled member of Spica's gang.
- Alex Kingston as Adele, a red-dressed waitress at the restaurant.
- Roger Lloyd-Pack as Geoff, a fellow gangster and diner.
- Bob Goody as Starkie, a member of Spica's gang.
- Flavia Brilli as the cabaret singer.

== Production ==
=== Writing ===
Peter Greenaway has said that the Jacobean play 'Tis Pity She's a Whore provided him with the main template for his screenplay.

=== Music ===
Michael Nyman's score prominently incorporated his 1985 composition Memorial.

=== Design ===
Jean-Paul Gaultier designed the costumes. Italian chef Giorgio Locatelli prepared the food used as props. As characters move from location to location throughout the film, their costumes change colours to match. Outside the restaurant is blue, the kitchen is green, the dining room red, the restrooms white, and the book depository orange/brown. Greenaway stated the changing of colours represents how characters move between and inhabit each different world.

== Release ==
=== Box office ===
The film debuted at the 1989 Toronto International Film Festival and was released on 13 October 1989 in London on two screens. It grossed over $500,000 in London. During its opening week in Paris it grossed $158,500.

It earned £640,213 in the UK. Miramax acquired the rights for $500,000 and released the film in New York on 6 April 1990. It was Greenaway's first film to be released fully in the US since The Draughtsman's Contract in 1982. It grossed $7.7 million in the US.

=== Versions ===
The film's original running time was 124 minutes. Due to the content, the MPAA gave Miramax a choice of either an X rating or go unrated (adults only) for theatrical release. Unrated was chosen in light of the X rating being more associated with pornographic films. Two versions of the film were released on VHS in the 1990s. One was an R-rated cut running 95 minutes (mainly for large video store chains); the other was the original version.

=== Critical reception ===
The film received generally positive reviews from critics. On Rotten Tomatoes, it holds an 87% rating based on 52 reviews, with an average rating of 7.60/10. The site's consensus states: "This romantic crime drama may not be to everyone's taste, but The Cook, the Thief, His Wife & Her Lover is an audacious, powerful film." The film received a score of 62 on Metacritic based on reviews from 23 critics, indicating "generally favorable reviews". Roger Ebert of the Chicago Sun-Times gave the film four out of four stars, noting that its raw emotion and violent interpersonal conflict was a departure from Greenaway's typically cerebral and intellectual films.

== Soundtrack ==
The Cook, the Thief, His Wife & Her Lover is the twelfth album released by Michael Nyman and the ninth to feature the Michael Nyman Band. The album includes the first commercially released recording of Nyman's composition Memorial.

There is some music not included on the soundtrack album: the love theme for Michael and Georgina, which is "Fish Beach" from Drowning by Numbers; the song performed as a show in the restaurant, sung by actress and singer Flavia Brilli; or a variation of "Memorial" that occurs about halfway through the film. Edits of "Memorial" appear throughout the film, with the entire twelve-minute movement accompanying the final scene and end credits, but one variation is uniquely created for the film.

== See also ==
- List of cult films
