= Swanky Modes =

British fashion brand

Swanky Modes was a British fashion brand that opened in 1972 in London's Camden Town district. It consisted of four designers: Judy Dewsbury, Melanie Haberfield, Willie Walters and Esme Young, and was located at 106 Camden Road, London.

In the 1970s, they used form-fitting designs and their clients included Midge Ure, Cher and Grace Jones. They created the Amorphous Dress, which is now part of the V&A collection. Swanky Modes also featured clothes in magazines and newspapers including Vogue, Nova, Honey, 19, ID, The Face, Boulevard, Interview, The Sunday Times, Express, Mail, and the V&A Little Black Dress Book.

== See also ==
- Jazz Frames
