= Satsangi (band) =

British Indian rock band

- Origin: London, England
- Genres: Rock and roll; punk rock; new wave
- Years active: 2000–present
- Labels: Mr Babu Records, The India Record Company, Northern Star Records, 100% APE Records
- Members: Sujatha Menon; Johnny Herbert; Dave Holland; Richard Heath; Rob Barrett
- Website: www.satsangiband.com

Satsangi is a British Indian musical band which performs around various cities in United Kingdom. Initially formed by Sujatha Menon and Johnny Herbert, Satsangi first attracted attention with the track 'Iodine', with the video having global exposure on MTV Iggy (New York) and MTV India.

The band's first album was No Shoes in Satsang Hall (2011). Then their second release was an EP, titled Baby Doll in 2012, followed in 2013 by 'Satsangi Shruti Project'.

Satsangi's released their second Lick My Lungs in 2016. It included 14 tracks and guest artist remixes. "We wanted Lick My Lungs to reflect the raw energy of the band live, but also to show an experimental spirit with risks and a broad range of creative ideas. It is also important to mix the east and west in terms of cultural backgrounds. Therefore the collection is a combination of in your face rock n' roll and music derived from Hindu devotional songs. We are really pleased with how all the ideas hang together on the album, which hopefully makes a statement that defines Satsangi." says Johnny Herbert, a member of the Satsangi Band.

You Saw Something, was released in 2018 on Blood Count Records. This album was recorded and produced by John Rivers at Woodbine Street Studio.

‘Shivoham – Lockdown Lullabies’, an album dedicated to raising money for The NHS COVID-19 APPEAL FUND was released in 2020. All funds raised by the album were given to the NHS.

In 2021 ’World Falling Down’ Satsangi's collaborative project combining music, video and poetry, was premiered at The Coventry Dresden Friendship Festival and supported by Coventry City of Culture. All songs were written and recorded by the band during lockdown.This album is an artistic response to a changing and troubled world.

Satsangi sign a new contract with Mr Babu in 2023, with the label commissioning an animation video for exclusive release of the band's new single ‘Ultraviolet’. Mr Babu will schedule for re-release the bands back catalogue, both audio and video.

== Biography ==
"It all started when downstairs mother was singing classical Indian ragas, upstairs I was listening to Led Zeppelin wondering what it would sound like if Kishori Amonkar sang with the B-52's." says Sujatha Menon

The roots begin in the experimental British art school environment, where Menon met Herbert, they started writing songs drawing on their eastern and western music influences, then joined by other musicians and Satsangi.

The band have since had their first album No Shoes in Satsang Hall reviewed in Rolling Stone magazine, gigged with The Kills, The Primitives, headlined in London, played at major festivals alongside artists such as Elvis Costello, Tom Jones, Jools Holland, and Martha and the Vandellas. Satsangi videos, made in collaboration with artist Paul Windridge are broadcast globally on MTV networks. They are signed to Mr Babu and released by The Orchard.

'Satsangi draw juice from eclectic sources, from Iggy Pop and The Stooges, X-Ray Spex, Sonic Youth, to Nina Simone, PJ Harvey, and Kishori Amonkar .........the list goes on.' says Johnny Herbert, a member of the Satsangi Band

"Iodine reminds me a bit of Sonic Youth but with infinitely better singing with tough sax break that made me think of X-Ray Spex. The whole thing sounds nervy, dislocated and very tense – just the way I like it" says Steve Chandra Savale of Asian Dub Foundation. The band is known for the blend of Eastern and Western music culture. Bobby Friction from the BBC Asian Network says "I feel like I could play that for the next hour or so, but then I'd lose my job, she sounds brilliant her name is Sujatha Menon, she's the lead singer of Satsangi".

== Albums ==
2021 - World Falling Down

2018 - You Saw Something

2016 - Lick My Lungs

2011 - No Shoes In Satsang Hall
