= Hi Fly (Peter King album) =

Live album by Peter King
- Released: 1984
- Recorded: March 4, 1984
- Genre: Jazz
- Length: 44:01
- Label: Spotlite
- Producer: Tony Williams

Peter King chronology
East 34th Street (1983)	Hi Fly (1984)	Brother Bernard (1988)

Professional ratings
Review scores
Source	Rating
Allmusic	3/5 stars

Hi Fly is a live jazz album by British saxophonist Peter King with the Philippe Briand Trio, recorded live at Le Plateau des Quatre Vent, Lorient, Brittany, France, by Daniel Duigou on 4 March 1984. It was King's fourth album on the Spotlite label.

== Track listing ==
1. "Blues for S.J." (King) – 9:05
2. "Hi Fly" (Randy Weston) – 12:18
3. "Star Eyes" (Gene de Paul, Don Raye) – 8:10
4. "Old Folks" (Dedett Lee Hill, Willard Robison) – 8:08
5. "Seven Steps to Heaven" (Miles Davis, Victor Feldman) – 4:40

== Personnel ==
- Peter King – alto saxophone
- Pete Jacobsen – piano
- Riccardo del Fra – bass
- Philippe Briand – drums
- Jakez Moreau – conga (on 2)
