= Peter King (saxophonist) =

British jazz musician (1940–2020)

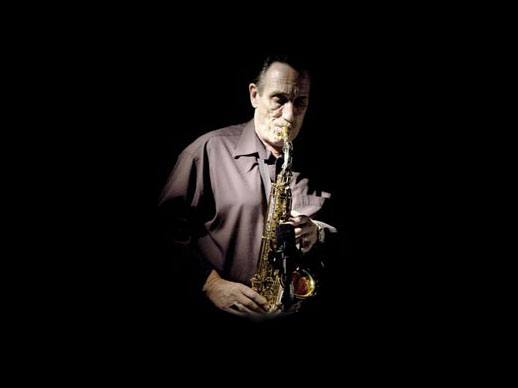
- King in 2008

Background information
- Born: Peter John King; 11 August 1940; Kingston upon Thames, England
- Died: 23 August 2020 (aged 80) London, England
- Genres: Jazz, modern jazz
- Occupations: Musician, composer
- Instrument: Saxophone
- Years active: 1959–2009
- Formerly of: Charlie Watts
- Website: peterkingjazz.com

Peter John King (11 August 1940 – 23 August 2020) was an English jazz saxophonist, composer, and clarinettist.

== Early life ==
Peter King was born in Kingston upon Thames, Surrey, England. He took up the clarinet and saxophone as a teenager, entirely self-taught. His first public appearances were in 1957, playing alto in a trad jazz group at the Swan Public House, Kingston, in a group organised by trumpeter Alan Rosewell, with whom he worked at the Directorate of Overseas Surveys as an apprentice cartographer. After the performance, however, King made the choice of becoming a professional musician. He came under the strong musical influence of Charlie Parker developing a bebop style inspired by Parker.

== Career ==
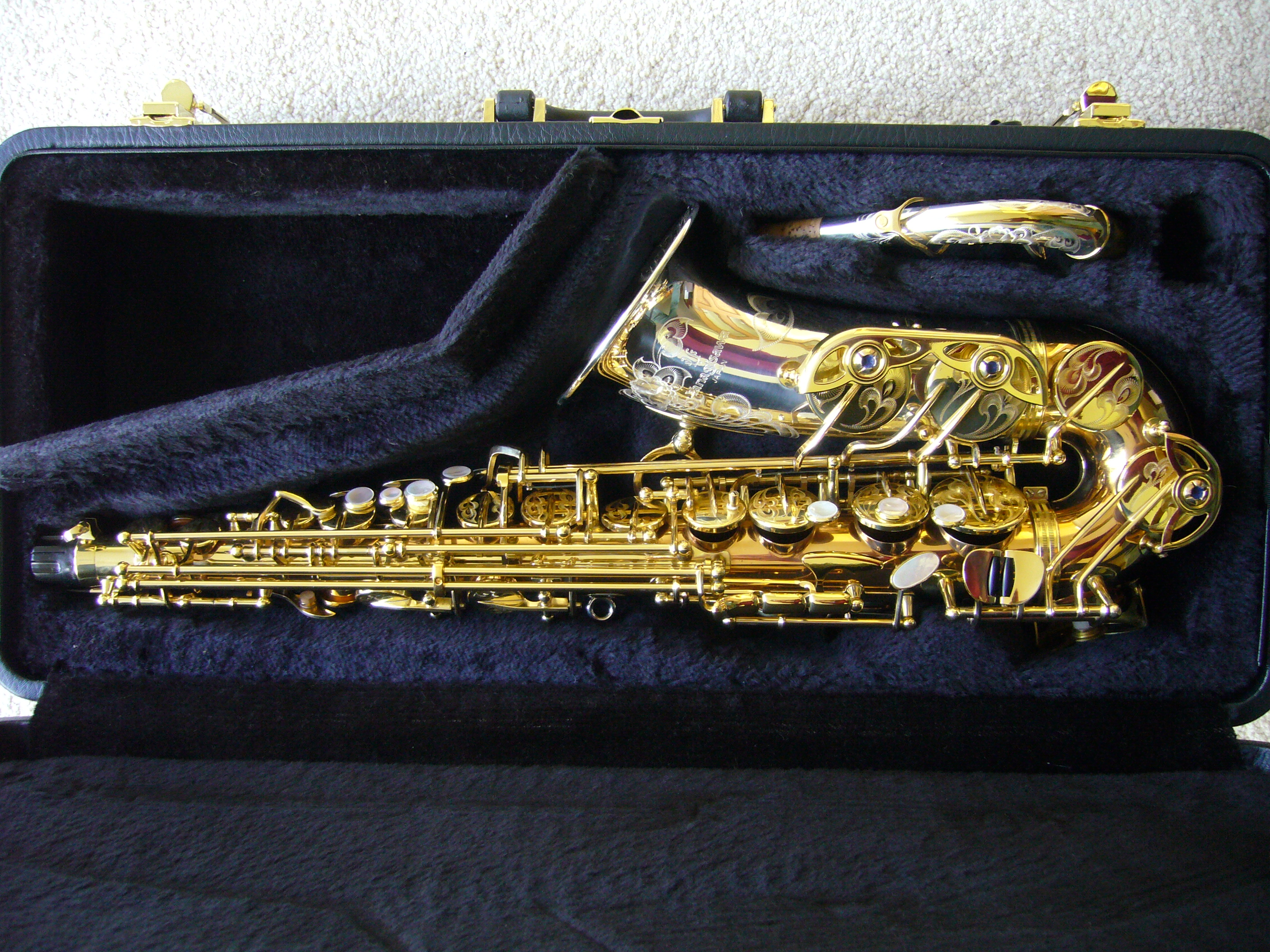
A Yanagisawa A9932J alto saxophone which is very similar to the A9932Z played by Peter King. It has a solid silver bell and neck with solid phosphor bronze body. The bell, neck and key-cups are extensively engraved. Manufactured in 2008

In 1959, at the age of 19, he was booked by Ronnie Scott to perform at the opening of Scott's club in Gerrard Street, London. In the same year, he received the Melody Maker New Star award. He worked with Johnny Dankworth's orchestra from 1960 to 1961, and went on to work with the big bands of Maynard Ferguson, Tubby Hayes, Harry South, and Stan Tracey, the Brussels Big Band, and the Ray Charles band on a European tour.

He also played in small groups with musicians such as Philly Joe Jones, Zoot Sims, Al Cohn, Red Rodney, Hampton Hawes, Nat Adderley, Al Haig, John Burch, Bill Watrous, and Dick Morrissey, Tony Kinsey, Bill Le Sage and singers such as Jimmy Witherspoon, Joe Williams, Jon Hendricks, and Anita O'Day. His powerful and exuberant bebop style with great technical facility, often led to comparisons with the style of his close friend the American altoist Phil Woods, although King's playing was increasingly personal and distinctive even within the bebop idiom. His musical curiosity led him to associate with freer idioms in John Stevens' 'Freebop' group in the 1980s. He appeared on the soundtrack of the 1969 film The Italian Job. He was a member of Charlie Watts' Tentet.

Especially from the early 1990s, his style matured into a highly confident originality, going far beyond its initial Parker influences and absorbing harmonic and structural ideas from his favourite classical composer Béla Bartók. He flourished both as an improviser and a composer and found ways of combining jazz and classical techniques without diluting either. The results of this development were heard especially on his albums Tamburello (recorded in 1994), Lush Life (recorded 1998) and Janus with the Lyric String Quartet, which included a 1997 suite strongly influenced by Bartok and commissioned by Appleby Jazz Festival organiser Neil Ferber with funding from BBC Radio 3. In 2005, Peter King won the BBC 'Musician of the Year' award.

King made appearances on albums by the pop group Everything But The Girl and on North Marine Drive by Ben Watt, who was a member of the group. Watt produced the album Crusade that King recorded for Blanco y Negro in 1989.

In 2012, King appeared in the documentary film, No One But Me, discussing jazz vocalist Annie Ross. He appeared in the movies Blue Ice and The Talented Mr. Ripley. In April 2011, Northway published his autobiography Flying High, widely praised for its candour and honesty about his musical career and personal life, his international associations in the jazz world, and the many years in which he battled addiction.

King was also a leading figure in the international aero-modelling world. He competed successfully in major competitions and wrote extensively about the subject. Among his other strong interests was Formula One motor racing and his 1994 album Tamburello contains a four-part composition that presents a tribute to Ayrton Senna. King played monthly residencies for many years at the Bulls Head in Barnes and the 606 Jazz Club in Chelsea.

== Death ==
King died in Putney, on 23 August 2020, aged 80. His sister Brenda survives him. King had been married twice. His first marriage to Joy Marshall ended upon her death in 1968. His second marriage to Linda Froud lasted from 1969 until her death in March 2007.

== Discography ==
=== As leader ===
- New Beginning (Spotlite, 1982)
- Bebop Live (Spotlite, 1983)
- East 34th Street (Spotlite, 1983)
- Focus (KPM Music, 1983)
- 90% of 1 Per Cent (Spotlite, 1985)
- In Paris (Blue Silver, 1986)
- Hi Fly (Spotlite, 1988)
- Brother Bernard (Miles Music, 1988)
- Live at the Bull (Bull's Head, 1988)
- Crusade (Blanco y Negro, 1989)
- Tamburello (Miles Music, 1995)
- Speed Trap (Jazz House, 1996)
- Lush Life (Miles Music, 1999)
- Footprints (Miles Music, 2003)
- Janus (Miles Music, 2006)

=== As sideman ===
With Everything but the Girl

- Eden (Blanco y Negro, 1984)
- Love Not Money (Blanco y Negro, 1985)
- Baby, the Stars Shine Bright (Blanco y Negro/WEA 1986)
- Idlewild (Blanco y Negro/WEA 1988)
- Amplified Heart (Blanco y Negro, 1994)

With Georgie Fame

- The Two Faces of Fame (CBS, 1967)
- The Blues and Me (Go Jazz, 1995)
- Name Droppin': Live at Ronnie Scott's (Go Jazz, 1997)
- Walking Wounded: Live at Ronnie Scott's (Go Jazz, 1998)
- Relationships (Three Line Whip, 2001)

With Maynard Ferguson

- M.F. Horn (Columbia, 1970)
- M.F. Horn Two (Columbia, 1972)
- The Lost Tapes Vol. One (Sleepy Night, 2007)
- The Lost Tapes Vol. Two (Sleepy Night, 2008)

With Tubby Hayes

- Tubbs' Tours (Fontana, 1964)
- England's Late Jazz Great (IAJRC, 1987)
- 200% Proof (Master Mix, 1992)
- Rumpus (Savage Solweig, 2015)

With Tony Kinsey

- How to Succeed in Business Without Really Trying (Decca, 1963)
- Jazz Scenes (Chappell, 1993)
- Blue Circles (Jazz House, 2003)

With Colin Towns

- Mask Orchestra (Jazz Label, 1993)
- Nowhere & Heaven (Provocateur, 1996)
- Bolt from the Blue (Provocateur, 1997)
- Dreaming Man with Blue Suede Shoes (Provocateur, 1999)
- Another Think Coming (Provocateur, 2001)
- The Orpheus Suite (Provocateur, 2004)

With Stan Tracey

- Free an' One (Columbia, 1970)
- The Bracknell Connection (Steam, 1976)
- Stan Tracey Now (Steam, 1983)
- Genesis (Steam, 1987)
- We Still Love You Madly (Mole Jazz, 1989)
- Portraits Plus (Blue Note, 1992)
- Live at the QEH (Blue Note, 1994)
- The Durham Connection (33 Jazz, 1999)

With Charlie Watts

- Live at Fulham Town Hall (CBS, 1986)
- From One Charlie (UFO, 1991)
- Warm & Tender (Continuum, 1993)
- Long Ago & Far Away (Pointblank/Virgin, 1996)
- Watts at Scott's (Black Box/Sanctuary, 2004)
- A tribute to Charlie Parker with strings (The Continuum Group, Inc, 1992)

With others

- Guy Barker, Guy Barker's Extravaganza Isn't It (Spotlite, 1993)
- David Bedford, Rigel 9 (Charisma, 1985)
- John Burch, Jazzbeat (Rhythm & Blues, 2019)
- Buzzcocks, Running Free (United Artists, 1980)
- CCS, C.C.S. (RAK, 1970)
- Hoagy Carmichael, Georgie Fame, Annie Ross, In Hoagland (Bald Eagle, 1981)
- Caravan, For Girls Who Grow Plump in the Night (Deram, 1973)
- Al Cohn & Zoot Sims, Al & Zoot in London (World Record Club, 1967)
- George Coleman, Blues Inside Out (Jazz House, 1996)
- John Dankworth, What the Dickens! (Fontana, 1963)
- Delme Quartet, Journeys (New Southern Library, 1984)
- Keith Emerson, Honky (Castle Music, 1983)
- Esther Galil, Z. Land (Barclay, 1976)
- John Harle, The Shadow of the Duke (EMI, 1992)
- Jon Hendricks, Jon Hendricks Live (Fontana, 1970)
- Philly Joe Jones, Trailways Express (Black Lion, 1971)
- Quincy Jones, The Italian Job (Paramount, 1969)
- Salena Jones, Platinum (CBS, 1971)
- Julian Joseph, Reality (EastWest, 1993)
- Roger Kellaway, Lenny by Julian Barry (1999)
- Stan Kenton, Horns of Plenty Vol. 3 (Tantara, 2014)
- Kiri Te Kanawa & Nelson Riddle, Blue Skies (Decca, 1985)
- Alexis Korner, Bootleg Him! (Warner Bros., 1972)
- Jackie Leven, Forbidden Songs of the Dying West (Cooking Vinyl, 1995)
- Vic Lewis, Tea Break (Concept, 1985)
- Vic Lewis, Vic Lewis Big Bands (Concept, 1988)
- The Nice, Five Bridges (Virgin,)
- RAH Band, The Crunch & Beyond (Ebony, 1978)
- RAH Band, Mystery (RCA, 1985)
- Red Rodney, With the Bebop Preservation Society (Spotlite, 1981)
- Annie Ross, Loguerhythms (Transatlantic, 1963)
- Annie Ross] Live in London (Harkit, 2003)
- Doug Sides, Sumbio (Laika, 1997)
- Hal Singer, Swing On It (JSP, 1981)
- John Stevens, Freebop (Affinity, 1982)
- Louis Stewart, Angel Eyes (Blau, 2006)
- Joe Temperley, Concerto for Joe (Hep, 1995)
- Eliana Tomkins, Rapture (Jazz7, 2005)
- Derek Wadsworth, Space: 1999 Year 2 (Silva Screen, 2009)
- Clifford T. Ward, Escalator (Charisma, 1975)
- Clifford T. Ward, Waves (Philips, 1976)
- Ben Watt, North Marine Drive (Cherry Red, 1983)
- Don Weller, Live (33 Jazz, 1997)
- Kate Westbrook, Cuff Clout (Voiceprint, 2004)
- Jimmy Witherspoon, Big Blues (JSP, 1981)
