= Alex Clarke (saxophonist) =

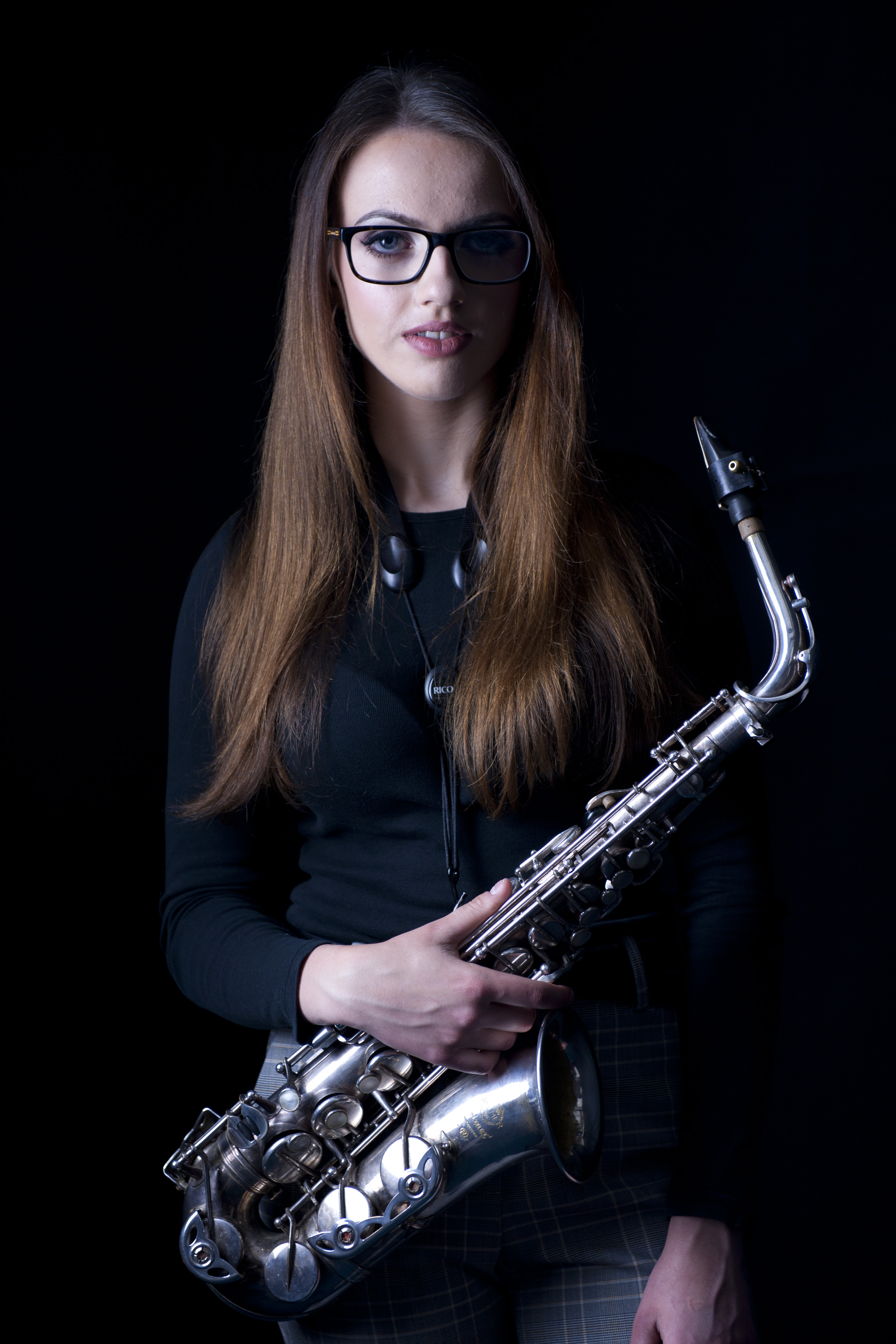
- Clarke in 2018

Background information
- Born: Alexandra Berenice Clarke; 14 December 1999 (age 25); Macclesfield, England
- Genres: Jazz
- Instrument(s): Alto Saxophone; Tenor Saxophone; Clarinet; Flute
- Years active: 2016–present
- Website: alexclarkejazz.co.uk

Alexandra Berenice Clarke (born 14 December 1999) is an English jazz saxophone player, bandleader and educator.

== Awards ==
Clarke was a finalist in the BBC Young Jazz Musician of the Year 2020, winner of the Rising Star category in the 2019 British Jazz Awards and nominee in the Parliamentary Jazz Awards 2021 & 2022.

== Education ==
Clarke attended King's School, Macclesfield and has studied saxophone with Andy Scott, Andy Panayi and Dean Masser. Attending the Royal Birmingham Conservatoire, Clarke left after a year to pursue an active career on the British Jazz scene and later named her 2022 album Only A Year in reference.

Clarke is an alumna of the UK-based National Youth Jazz Collective, attending the Short Course in 2015 and the 7-day Summer School in 2016, 2017 & 2018. Notable tutors she has gone on to work with regularly include Karen Sharp, Alec Dankworth and Steve Waterman and Clarke herself is now a tutor for NYJC.

== Career ==
An active participant on the British Jazz scene since 2016, Clarke has appeared alongside notable British Jazz musicians including Alan Barnes, Art Themen, Henry Lowther, Mornington Lockett, Mark Nightingale, Clark Tracey and Spike Wells, and has opened for American pianist Emmet Cohen.

Featuring regularly with the National Youth Jazz Orchestra and the Simon Spillett big band, since 2020 Clarke has been touring her own quartet featuring Dave Newton, Dave Green and Steve Brown and has been working regularly with the Ronnie Scott's Jazz Orchestra since 2023.

== Discography ==
As a leader

- 2018: Mirage
- 2022: Only A Year (Stray Horn Records)
- 2025: Out of the Woods (ABC Records)

With T.J. Johnson

- 2019: Songs From The Jazz Country

With Chris Hodgkins And His Band

- 2022: A Salute To Humphrey Lyttelton

With Jake Leg Jug Band

- 2022: Live At Audley Theatre (Green Bullet Records)
- 2023: Hello Central (Green Bullet Records)

With Pacific Jazz

- 2023: The Lockdown Sessions

With Clark Tracey Quintet

- 2024: Introducing Emily Masser (Stray Horn Records)
