= Portraits Plus =

Studio album by Stan Tracey
- Released: December 1992
- Recorded: March 1992
- Genre: Jazz
- Label: Blue Note

Stan Tracey chronology
The Paradise Club (1989)	Portraits Plus (1992)	Live at the QEH (1993)

Portraits Plus is an album by the jazz pianist Stan Tracey. It was released in December 1992 and was shortlisted for the 1993 Mercury Prize.

== Critical reception ==
Professional ratings
Review scores
Source	Rating
AllMusic	4/5 stars

AllMusic called "Newk's Fluke" "a chugging, engaging post-bop vehicle which includes a blend of Latin and Brazilian rhythms and potent ensembles."

== Track listing ==
All compositions by Stan Tracey.

1. "Newk's Fluke" – 7:29
2. "Rocky Mount" – 7:55
3. "One for Gil" – 8:17
4. "Clinkscales" – 8:51
5. "Spectrum No 2" – 14:46
6. "Mainframe" – 11:19

== Personnel ==
- Guy Barker – trumpet
- Malcolm Griffiths – trombone
- Peter King – alto saxophone
- Don Weller – tenor saxophone
- Art Themen – tenor & soprano saxophone
- Stan Tracey – piano
- Dave Green – double bass
- Clark Tracey – drums
