= Simon Spillett =

English saxophonist (born 1974)

Simon Richard Spillett (born 4 November 1974, Chesham, Buckinghamshire, England) is a British jazz tenor saxophonist. He has won the BBC Jazz Awards Rising Star (2007), Jazz Journal's Critics' Choice album of the Year (2009), the British Jazz Awards Top Tenor Saxophonist (2011), and Services to British Jazz award (2016).

By 2017, he was leading his own quartet featuring pianist John Critchinson, bassist Alec Dankworth and drummer Clark Tracey, as well as appearing with bands led by other leaders including Ronnie Scott's Jazz Orchestra. After John Critchinson died, Rob Barron joined the quartet on piano. Drummer Pete Cater replaced Tracey in 2020.

Leading British jazz figures with whom he has worked include Sir John Dankworth, Stan Tracey, Peter King, Liane Carroll, Tina May, John Etheridge, Guy Barker, Alan Barnes and Bobby Wellins. American musicians with whom he has worked include Jon Hendricks, Kurt Elling, Bobby Shew and Monica Mancini.

Spillett's biography of saxophonist Tubby Hayes, The Long Shadow Of The Little Giant, was published by Equinox in 2015.

From 2016 to 2018 he contributed a regular monthly column to Jazz Journal, mixing humorous reflections on his experiences as a musician with observations about famous historical jazz figures. He has also acted as a compere at jazz festivals and appears in the anchor interview role in the 2015 documentary film Tubby Hayes: A Man In A Hurry.

== Early career ==
After studying with Eddie Harvey, Tony Russell and Ken Wray, Spillett's father Richard worked as a semi-professional musician, playing gigs with saxophonists Tony Coe, Jimmy Skidmore and Lol Coxhill.

A love of jazz grew through exposure to his father's record collection and by his teens he was listening to Charlie Parker, Dizzy Gillespie, Thelonious Monk, Stan Getz, Sonny Rollins, Stan Kenton, Frank Sinatra and others. His musical life began at school, singing in school choirs, while at home he learned a variety of brass instruments including the trombone and valve trombone. Spillett took up the alto saxophone aged 16 and taught himself initially by playing along with records. Aged 17, he switched to tenor saxophone inspired by hearing albums by John Coltrane, Stan Getz and Sonny Rollins. At this time he also played piano, clarinet and soprano saxophone.

In his late teens, Spillett began to sit in at local jazz venues, appearing with saxophonists Dick Morrissey, Art Themen, Spike Robinson and Duncan Lamont among others. At the same time, he began two and a half years of private saxophone tuition with saxophonist Vic Ash, then a member of the BBC Big Band.

Spillett began playing gigs aged seventeen with bands playing mainstream jazz. By the age of 21, he had turned professional. During the early 2000s he played gigs with, among others, saxophonists Peter King and Alan Skidmore, trumpeter Steve Waterman, guitarist John Etheridge and vocalist Tina May.

In 2005, Spillett formed a quartet featuring pianist John Critchinson and drummer Martin Drew. The band quickly became a popular attraction at UK jazz venues including Ronnie Scott's Jazz Club and the Brecon, Marlborough, Swanage, Birmingham, Wigan, Southport and Wavendon festivals. During this period Spillett also worked with English jazz players including Sir John Dankworth, Alan Barnes, Danny Moss, Stan Tracey, Bobby Wellins, Louis Stewart, Jack Parnell, Gwilym Simcock, Clark Tracey, Tony Kinsey Allan Ganley, Tony Levin and Spike Wells. In 2007, he joined the Ronnie Scott's Jazz Orchestra, and continues to work with the band. With this band, he worked with popular artists including Will Young and Mick Hucknall.

Spillett has appeared with American jazz artists including vocalist Jon Hendricks, trumpeter Bobby Shew, saxophonist Greg Abate, pianist Phil DeGreg, drummer Gregg Field and vocalist Monica Mancini.

== 2013–present ==
In 2013, Spillett was part of the co-operative band 'Standard Miles' also featuring trumpeter Henry Lowther, pianist John Critchinson, bassist Dave Green and drummer Trevor Tomkins. Performing the Great American songbook standards performed by various Miles Davis' quintets from 1955 to 1965, the band became a popular attraction at UK jazz clubs and festivals and until Critchinson's death in 2017 reformed for various one-off appearances.

In 2015-16, Spillett was working as a member of Pete Long's Jazz at The Philharmonic tribute package.

In October 2016, Spillett was appointed as a Patron of the Jazz Centre UK, joining fellow patrons Sir Michael Parkinson, Dame Cleo Laine, Van Morrison, Paul Jones (of Manfred Mann) and Jools Holland.

As of 2024, his quartet features Pete Billington, Alec Dankworth and Pete Cater.

In 2021, Spillett launched his own big band featuring, among others, trumpeter Mark Armstrong, trombonist Mark Nightingale and saxophonists Pete Long, Alex Garnett and Alan Barnes, debuting at London's 100 Club. The band focuses on the repertoire of Tubby Hayes.

Spillett was the partner of vocalist Tina May for two and a half years from 2019 before May's death, aged 60, in March 2022.

== Recordings and awards ==
In 2006, Spillett recorded his first album with his quartet. Introducing Simon Spillett which received widespread coverage in the jazz media, including airplay on Humphrey Lyttelton's BBC radio show The Best of Jazz and on the re-launched Jazz FM.

In 2007, a follow-up album, Sienna Red, was recorded by the same quartet with Spike Wells replacing Drew, which was nominated in the best album category of the BBC Jazz Awards. In 2009, Sienna Red won the critics' poll for Best Jazz Album of 2008/9 in Jazz Journal.

In 2007, Spillett recorded two albums' worth of material with tenor saxophonist Danny Moss. Featuring Mike Carr, John Pearce, Len Skeat, Danny Moss Junior and Martin Drew, these sessions remain unissued. In 2012, Spillett recorded for Gearbox Records. A limited edition vinyl album Square One was released the following March. In December 2013 this album was voted among the top jazz releases of the year in Jazz Journal

In 2007, Spillett won the BBC Jazz Award for Rising Star, accepting his award from actor Michael Brandon on BBC Radio 2 and appearing with the BBC Big Band directed by Guy Barker.

In 2011, Spillett won the tenor saxophone category of the British Jazz Awards. In 2016, Spillett won the Services To British Jazz Award in the British Jazz Awards.

In 2023 Spillett's big band released its debut album 'Dear Tubby H.', featuring previously unheard arrangements by Tubby Hayes.

== Media ==
Spillett has broadcast on BBC Radio 3's Jazz Line-Up with his quartet and has featured in several magazine interviews including in Jazz Rag (issues 96 and 97) and Jazz Journal (April 2008). He took part in "The Test" in Jazz Journal magazine during November and December 2012.

Spillett is the anchor interviewee in the 2015 documentary film Tubby Hayes: A Man In A Hurry, written by Mark Baxter, directed by Lee Cogswell, produced by Paul Weller and with narration by actor Martin Freeman.

== Influences ==
Spillett's primary influence on the tenor saxophone is often cited as Tubby Hayes, although in interviews he has credited John Coltrane as his all-time favourite saxophonist. He has also named Ronnie Scott, Sonny Rollins, Dick Morrissey, Hank Mobley, Ben Webster, Stan Getz and Alan Skidmore as inspirations.

Spillett has also cited Duke Ellington, Horace Silver and Miles Davis as inspirations.

== Writing ==
Spillett has contributed articles to magazines including Record Collector, Jazz Rag, Jazzwise and Jazz Journal.

He has also compiled and/or written CD sleeve notes for over one hundred albums for a variety of jazz specialist labels. In 2006, he co-authored the autobiography of Vic Ash I Blew It My Way and musicians including Alan Skidmore, Kenny Wheeler and Stan Tracey have commissioned him to write notes for their albums.

In 2008,The Little Giant, a 4-CD compilation of Tubby Hayes work assembled by Spillett for the Properbox label, won Best Reissue in the British Jazz Awards.

Spillett has also written a biography of Tubby Hayes, titled The Long Shadow of The Little Giant - The Life, Work and Legacy of Tubby Hayes (Equinox Publishing 2015). This book was nominated among the best music books of 2015 by The Guardian.

== Discography ==
- Introducing Simon Spillett (Woodville Records 2006)
- BBC Jazz Awards 2007 - one track (Specific Jazz 2007)
- Sienna Red (Woodville Records 2007)
- Similar Souls - Danny Moss and Simon Spillett (Avid Records 2007 UNISSUED)
- BBC Jazz Awards 2008 - one track (Specific Jazz 2008)
- Square One - (Gearbox Records 2013)
- Dear Tubby H - (Mister PC Records 2023)
- Up In Town - (Mister PC Records 2025)
