= Mark Nightingale =

English jazz trombonist, composer, and arranger

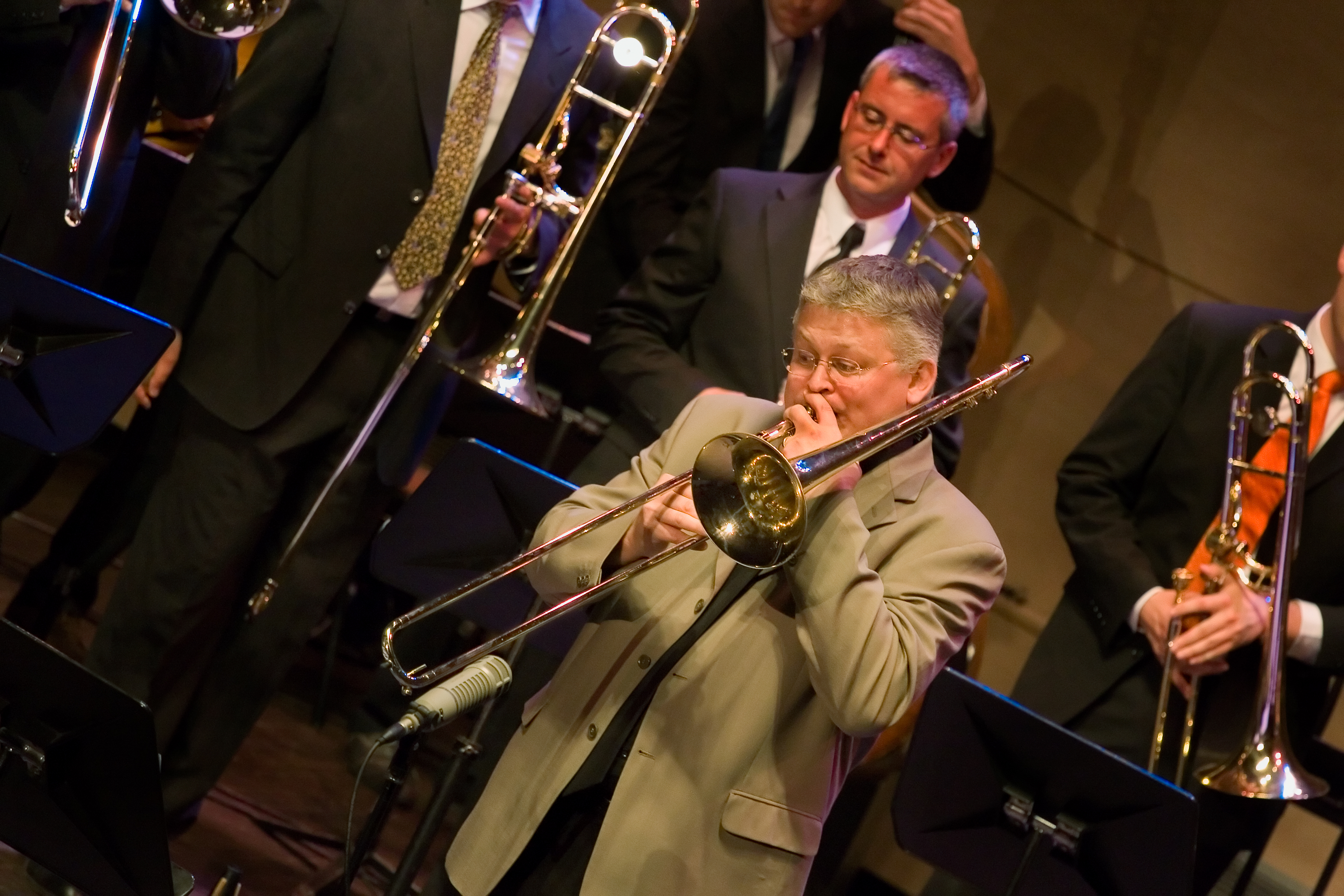
- Photo by Frank Kramer

Background information
- Born: Mark Daryl Nightingale; 29 May 1967 (age 58); Evesham, Worcestershire, England
- Genres: Jazz
- Occupation(s): Musician, composer, arranger
- Instrument: Trombone
- Years active: 1980s–present
- Website: mark-nightingale.co.uk

Mark Daryl Nightingale (born 29 May 1967) is an English jazz trombonist, composer, and arranger.

== Career ==
He began on trombone at age nine, and played in the Midland Youth Jazz Orchestra and the National Youth Jazz Orchestra in his teens. He attended Trinity College of Music from 1985 to 1988. His first band as leader was a trombone quintet called Bonestructure and he has gone on to front various sized groups from quartets and quintets to a Big Band featuring his own compositions and arrangements. Nightingale toured and recorded with James Morrison in Europe from 1994 to 1997. He has had longstanding musical relationships with John Dankworth, Stan Tracey, Alan Barnes and Andy Panayi. Nightingale has composed for trombone and other brass instruments. His published works include 20 Jazz Etudes (1995), Multiplicity (1996) Easy Jazzy Tudes (1998), Turning Back the Clock (2004), and Urbieplicity (2010). He played trombone on the album Ten Summoner's Tales by Sting.

He has worked with or recorded with Louie Bellson, Ray Brown, Carl Fontana, Urbie Green, Scott Hamilton, Slide Hampton, Bill Holman, Lee Konitz, Cleo Laine, Claire Martin, Clark Terry, and Kenny Wheeler; Steely Dan, Kylie Minogue, Tom Jones, Madonna, Robbie Williams, Henry Mancini, McFly, Frank Sinatra, John Wilson, and Michel Legrand. He occasionally directs the BBC Big Band.

He was design consultant for the first instrument made by Michael Rath Trombones.

== Awards and honors ==
- British Jazz Awards - Best Trombonist (1994), (1996), (1998), (2000), (2002), (2004), (2006), (2008), (2009), (2010), (2011) (2013), (2014), (2015), (2016), (2017), (2018)
- Worshipful Company of Musicians - Young Jazz Musician Award (1996)
- British Jazz Award - Rising Star 1993

== Discography ==
=== As leader ===
- Bone Structure (Calligraph, 1989)
- I Got Rhythm with the London Brass (Teldec, 1991)
- What I Wanted to Say with Ray Brown, Jeff Hamilton, Dado Moroni (Mons, 1994)
- Remember the Time with Clark Terry, Ray Brown, Jeff Hamilton, Dado Moroni (Mons, 1995)
- Some of Our Best Friends with the London Trombone Quartet (ASC, 1996)
- Destiny (Mons, 1997)
- A Nightingale Sang (2005)
- Out of the Box (Woodville, 2010)
- 21 Trombones in the 21st Century with the New Trombone Collective (New Trombone Collective, 2010)
- The Sound of Jay & Kai with Alistair White (Woodville, 2014)

=== As sideman ===
With Alan Barnes

- A Dotty Blues (Zephyr, 1998)
- The Sherlock Holmes Suite (Woodville, 2003)
- The Marbella Jazz Suite (Big Bear, 2004)
- Songs for Unsung Heroes (Woodville, 2004)
- Seven Ages of Jazz (Woodville, 2006)
- A Jazz Christmas Carol (Woodville, 2015)
- Fish Tales (Woodville, 2017)
- 60th Birthday Celebration (Woodville, 2019)

With John Dankworth

- Nebuchadnezzar (Jazz House, 1994)
- Rhythm Changes (Jazz House, 1995)
- In a Mellow Tone (Qnote, 2005)
- Live at Ronnie Scotts (Sepia)

With James Newton Howard

- Maleficent (Disney, 2014)
- Fantastic Beasts and Where to Find Them (Music On Vinyl, 2016)
- Fantastic Beasts: The Crimes of Grindelwald (Sony/WaterTower Music, 2018)

With Claire Martin

- Old Boyfriends (Linn, 1995)
- Off Beat (Linn, 1995)
- A Modern Art (Linn, 2015)

With Andy Panayi

- Blown Away (Jazz House, 1998)
- Time Displaced (Mainstem, 2002)
- News from Blueport (Woodville, 2005)
- The Solar Cats (Woodville, 2009)
- Play Woolf Notes (Woolfnotes)
- Whooeeee! (Mainstem)

With Colin Towns

- Mask Orchestra (Jazz Label, 1993)
- Nowhere & Heaven (Provocateur, 1996)
- Bolt from the Blue (Provocateur, 1997)
- Dreaming Man with Blue Suede Shoes (Provocateur, 1999)
- Another Think Coming (Provocateur, 2001)

With Robbie Williams

- Live at the Albert (Chrysalis, 2001)
- Swing When You're Winning (Chrysalis, 2001)
- Swings Both Ways (Island, 2013)

With others

- Tina Arena, Songs of Love & Loss 2 (EMI/Capitol 2008)
- BBC Big Band, Special Edition (Actionbyte, 1990)
- John Barrowman, John Barrowman (Sony/Arista, 2010)
- Ana Belén, Veneno Para el Corazon (Ariola, 1993)
- Thilo Berg, Carnival of Life (Mons, 1992)
- Thilo Berg & Barbara Morrison, Live Blues for Ella (Mons, 1993)
- Chris Botti, When I Fall in Love (Columbia, 2004)
- Melanie C, Stages (Red Girl, 2012)
- Paul Carrack, Soul Shadows (Carrack-UK, 2016)
- Codeine Velvet Club, Codeine Velvet Club (Island, 2009)
- Laurence Cottle, Jazz! (KPM Music, 2001)
- Jamie Cullum, Twentysomething (Universal/Verve/Candid, 2003)
- Dominique Dalcan, Cannibale (Crammed Discs, 1993)
- Dominique Dalcan, Ostinato (Island, 1998)
- Ray Davies, Red Hot Latin (JW Music Library, 1996)
- Alexandre Desplat, The Grand Budapest Hotel (Fox, 2014)
- Michael Davis, Absolute Trombone II (Hip-Bone Music, 2007)
- Sheena Easton, Fabulous (Universal, 2000)
- Lance Ellington, Lessons in Love (Vocalion, 2005)
- Paloma Faith, Fall to Grace (Epic, 2012)
- Georgie Fame, The Birthday Band (Three Line Whip, 2007)
- Chris Farlowe, As Time Goes By (MIG, 2013)
- James Galway, Tango del Fuego (RCA Victor, 1998)
- James Galway, Un-Break My Heart (RCA Victor, 1999)
- Allan Ganley, June Time (Vocalion, 2009)
- Michael Giacchino, Jurassic World: Fallen Kingdom (Back Lot Music, 2018)
- Beth Gibbons, Out of Season (Go! Beat, 2002)
- Michael Gibbs, Play Gil Evans (Whirlwind, 2013)
- God Help the Girl, God Help the Girl (Matador, 2009)
- Johnny Hallyday, Mon Pays C'est L'amour (Warner, 2018)
- Scott Hamilton, Our Delight (Woodville, 2006)
- John Harle, The Shadow of the Duke (EMI, 1992)
- Gavin Harrison, Cheating the Polygraph (Kscope, 2015)
- Alan Hawkshaw & Brian Bennett, Full Circle (KPM Music, 2018)
- The Horrors, Skying (XL, 2011)
- John Illsley, Testing the Water (Creek, 2014)
- Incognito, 100 degrees and Rising (Talkin' Loud, 1995)
- Tom Jones, Reload (Gut, 1999)
- Gerard Kenny, Coming Home (Park, 2005)
- Stan Kenton, Horns of Plenty Vol. 3 (Tantara, 2014)
- Tony Kinsey, Jazz Scenes (Chappell, 1993)
- Eartha Kitt, I'm Still Here (Arista, 1989)
- Eartha Kitt, Live in London (Ariola, 1990)
- Hans Koller, Cry, Want (Psi, 2010)
- Seth MacFarlane, Holiday for Swing! (Republic 2014)
- Janette Mason, Din and Tonic (Fireball, 2004)
- Jane McDonald, Jane McDonald (Focus, 1998)
- Jane McDonald, Love at the Movies (Universal, 2001)
- Kylie Minogue, Showgirl Homecoming Live (Parlophone, 2007)
- James Morrison, Live in Paris (EastWest, 1994)
- Van Morrison, Duets: Re-working the Catalogue (RCA, 2015)
- Laura Mvula, Sing to the Moon (RCA Victor/Sony, 2013)
- National Youth Jazz Orchestra, Cookin' with Gas (NYJO, 1990)
- National Youth Jazz Orchestra, NYJO Fifty (Whirlwind, 2015)
- Nightwish, Once (Spinefarm, 2004)
- Nightwish, Endless Forms Most Beautiful (Nuclear Blast, 2015)
- Dave O'Higgins, Big Shake Up (Candid Productions, 2001)
- Dave O'Higgins, Push (Shortfuse, 2004)
- Jo O'Meara, Relentless (Sanctuary, 2005)
- Pet Shop Boys, Very (Parlophone, 1993)
- Gregory Porter, Nat King Cole & Me (Blue Note, 2017)
- Atticus Ross, The Book of Eli (Reprise, 2010)
- Shiro Sagisu, Music from Evangelion: 3.0 You Can (Not) Redo. (Starchild, 2012)
- Shiro Sagisu, Evangelion:3.33 You Can (Not) Redo (Starchild, 2013)
- Shakatak, Let the Piano Play (Victor, 1997)
- Shakatak, Shinin' On (Instinct, 1998)
- Joe Stilgoe, New Songs for Old Souls (Linn, 2015)
- Sting, Ten Summoner's Tales (A&M, 1993)
- Sting, My Songs (A&M/Cherrytree/Interscope 2019)
- Strictly Smokin' Big Band, ...& Friends (Jazz Sound Records, 2024)
- Take That, The Circus (Polydor, 2008)
- James Taylor Quartet, Retro Acid Jazz (Bruton Music, 1995)
- Clark Tracey, Full Speed Sideways (33 Jazz, 1994)
- Stan Tracey, The Durham Connection (33 Jazz, 1999)
- Stan Tracey, The Later Works (Resteamed, 2010)
- Warren Vache & Alan Barnes, The London Sessions (Woodville, 2011)
- Benjamin Wallfisch, King of Thieves (Milan, 2018)
- Charlie Watts, Watts at Scott's (Black Box/Sanctuary, 2004)
- Don Weller, Live (33 Jazz, 1997)
- Westlife, ...Allow Us to Be Frank (RCA, 2004)
- Wet Wet Wet, 10 (Mercury, 1997)
- Kenny Wheeler, A Long Time Ago (ECM, 1999)
- Kenny Wheeler, The Long Waiting (CAM Jazz, 2012)
- Tommy Whittle, The Tenor Connection (Spotlite, 2010)
- Workshy, The Golden Mile (WEA, 1989)
- Hans Zimmer, Kung Fu Panda 3 (Sony, 2016)
