= Appleby Jazz Festival =

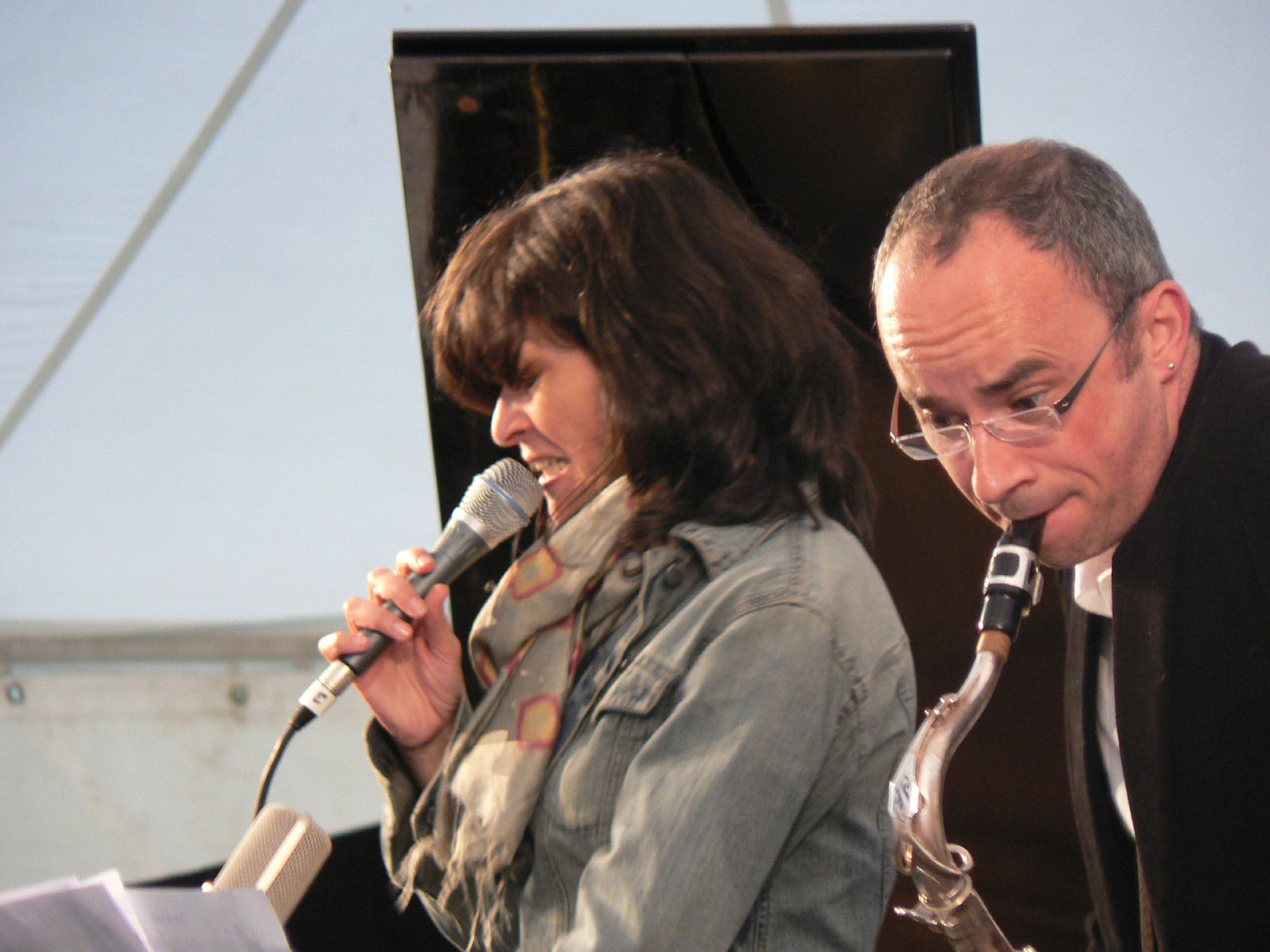
- Maria Pia De Vito and Julian Arguelles at Appleby Jazz Festival 2007
- Genre: Jazz
- Location: Appleby-in-Westmorland
- Years active: 1989-2007
- Founders: Neil Ferber
- Website: Appleby Jazz Festival

The Appleby Jazz Festival was a jazz festival held annually in Appleby-in-Westmorland and organized by Neil Ferber: the first edition was in 1989 with a concert by the Stan Tracey Quartet and the last one was in 2007.

== Festival history ==
The venue for the first edition of the festival was on the ground floor of Bongate Mill, where Neil Ferber lived, with a concert by the Stan Tracey Quartet. The second edition was again at Bongate Mill in May 1990, with performances by Don Weller and Bryan Spring. Due to some licensing difficulties, the venue for the following festival was moved to the Appleby Castle.There was a performance by the Stan Tracey Octet.

Due to the increasing number of visitors, in the following years the festival was held in marquees along the banks of the Eden river, also using the redundant church of St. Michael for smaller, free improv. concerts recorded for the Free Zone Appleby series. The main genre was straight-ahead jazz, with the cream of British jazz such as Alan Barnes, David Newton, Stan Tracey, Peter King, and the likes of Evan Parker, Barry Guy and Phil Wachsmann in the free improvisational Free Zone.

== Discography ==
- Live at Appleby by Don Weller Quartet (Appleby Jazz Festival 1999)
- Quiet Moments - Ballads from Appleby Jazz Festival 2000 (various artists) - Friends Exclusive CD
- Free Zone Appleby series (Appleby Jazz Festival 2002–2007)
- The 3 Tenors at the Appleby Jazz Festival by Mornington Lockett, Art Themen, Don Weller
- Not the Last Waltz by The Gordon Beck Trio (Appleby Jazz Festival 2003)
- The Last Time I Saw You by Stan Tracey Trio feat. Peter King (Appleby Jazz Festival 2004)
- Stan Tracey Orchestra at the Appleby Jazz Festival by Stan Tracey Orchestra (Appleby Jazz Festival 2004, 2006)
- Appleby Blues by The Gordon Beck Trio (Appleby Jazz Festival 2005)
- When the Sun Comes Out by Bobby Wellins (Appleby Jazz Festival 2005)
- Live at Appleby Jazz Festival by John Donaldson & Mark Edwards (Appleby Jazz Festival 2005)
- Dancing in the Dark by Tony Coe & John Horler (Appleby Jazz Festival 2007)
- Live in Appleby by Lydian Sound Orchestra (Appleby Jazz Festival 2007)

== See also ==
- List of jazz festivals
- List of festivals in the United Kingdom
