= Into the Blue (Guy Barker album) =

1995 album

Studio album by Guy Barker
- Released: May 1995
- Recorded: December 1994 and February 1995
- Length: 63:00
- Label: Verve
- Producer: Guy Barker; Richard Cook

Guy Barker chronology
Isn't It? (1991)	Into the Blue (1995)	Timeswing (1996)

Into the Blue is an album by Guy Barker, released in late May 1995 by Verve Records. It was nominated for the 1995 Mercury Music Prize, but lost to Portishead's Dummy.

== Reception ==
The Times's Chris Parker wrote that Into the Blue "places Barker firmly where he deserves to be: in the growing ranks of world-class British jazz players."

L'Unità's Filippo Bianchi spoke negatively of the album, saying Barker "lacks the 'philosophy'" and "vocation to invent language" of European jazz greats.

== Track listing ==
All tracks composed by Guy Barker, except where noted.

1. "Into the Blue" – 6:43
2. "JJ Swing" – 6:10
3. "Oh Mr. Rex!" – 10:52
4. "Low Down Lullaby" (Leo Robin, Ralph Rainger) – 6:03
5. "Did It 'n' Did It" – 3:50
6. "The Sphinx" (Ornette Coleman) – 4:12
7. "Enigma" (Bernardo Sassetti) – 7:28
8. "Ill Wind" (Harold Arlen, Johnny Mercer) – 5:41
9. "This Is the Life (For Stan Tracey)" – 8:48
10. "Weather Bird Rag" (Joe Oliver, Louis Armstrong) – 3:13

== Personnel ==
=== Musicians ===
- Guy Barker – trumpet
- Sigurður Flosason – alto saxophone
- Bernardo Sassetti – piano
- Alec Dankworth – bass
- Ralph Salmins – drums

=== Technical ===
- Guy Barker and Richard Cook – producers
- Recorded in London, December 1994 and February 1995
- Tristan Beenz Powell – recording and mixing engineer
- Andy Taylor – assistant engineer
- Mike Tucker – assistant, editing and transfer
- Gary Moore – mastering engineer
- Lucy Ward – art direction and design
- Becky Stevenson – release coordination
- Nick White – photographer
