= Daniela Clynes =

Daniela Clynes is vocalist who has worked extensively in jazz and cabaret. She has been leading bands since completing the Guildhall School of Music post-graduate jazz course in the early 1990s. Her first quintet, formed with saxophonist Martin Hathaway, led to a songwriting collaboration, with Clynes providing lyrics to Hathaway's compositions. She formed the ten-piece jazz fusion group Calumet with trumpeter Noel Langley and pianist Peter Churchill (including Roger Beaujolais, Ralph Salmins, and Pete Eckford) for performances at the Barbican Centre, London.

During these early years in her career, Clynes made appearances as guest soloist with the Michael Garrick Ensemble, Eclectic Voices, and the London Jazz Orchestra. A cabaret-based band was formed with Noel Langley for dates at the Pizza on the Park, London, where she has performed regularly to full houses since 1995. During January and February 1999, Clynes's first 'live' album was recorded at this venue, featuring pianist Liam Noble, bass player Geoff Gascoyne, and drummer Clark Tracey.

An invitation to take part in a three-week workshop with other performers from various stylistic background led to Clynes originating the role of the 'American Wife' in the opera Hotel, written by award-winning playwright Caryl Churchill and composer Orlando Gough. This Second Stride production, directed by Ian Spink, toured England and Germany in 1996 and 1997.

A year later, Orlando Gough and Richard Chew created an eighteen-piece a capella vocal group, The Shout, of which Clynes was a member with Ian Shaw, Carol Grimes, Melanie Pappenheim, Wayne Ellington, and Manikam Yogeswara. She remained with The Shout through London venues: the Drill Hall, BAC, Purcell Room, the National Portrait Gallery and the Roundhouse plus national tours and radio and television broadcasts. Their debut album, Arrival, was released in 2001.

Her one-woman show Childsplay ran at the Canal Cafe Theatre during the summer of 1995. Her one-woman show Journey is based on the true story of a woman surviving the Warsaw Ghetto, escaping to Israel in 1950, and moving to England in 1960. It features James Pearson (piano) and Sam Burgess (bass) and is a combination of the structural storytelling of theatre with the spontaneous creativity of jazz. Premiered at the Pizza on the Park at the end of 2000, the show moved to the Kings Head Theatre, Islington, in July 2001 where it was filmed.

Her jazz collaborations include lyric writing for compositions by UK musicians Django Bates, Iain Ballamy, Martin Hathaway, Anita Wardell, and American guitarist Ron Affif.

In 2000 she formed a quartet with Jonathan Gee (piano), Sam Burgess (bass), and Clark Tracey (drums) for a performance at the London Jazz Festival. The quartet then recorded Clynes's first studio album, Gentle Persuasion, in 2001. She then flew to the U.S. for recording sessions with Clark Gayton (trombone), Kenny Rampton (trumpet), Jay Collins (sax), and Eddie Bobe (Latin percussion). The album was released on the independent label Mistress Music.
