= Phil Cordell =

British musician

- Also known as: Springwater, Dan the Banjo Man, Variation
- Born: 17 July 1947
- Origin: Enfield, London, United Kingdom
- Died: 31 March 2007 (aged 59)
- Genres: Pop, new age, folk
- Instruments: Vocals, keyboards, guitar, bass, drums
- Years active: 1963–2007
- Labels: Polydor, Rare Earth, MoWest

Phil Cordell (17 July 1947 – 31 March 2007) was a British musician who released a number of records in the late 1960s and 1970s under several stage names, most notably as Springwater and Dan the Banjo Man. He was a multi-instrumentalist and usually played all the instruments on his musical recordings.

== Background ==
After leaving school in 1963, Phil Cordell joined North London band Steve Douglas and the Challengers as a guitarist. The band soon morphed into The Prophets, but saw no mainstream success. Following this, Cordell formed a band called Tuesday's Children, and following a few single releases he left in 1967 to go solo. His first single, "Pumping the Water" was released in 1969 (although is sometimes credited under its B-side "Red Lady"). On this he was the sole instrumentalist, playing all the instruments himself as well as doing the vocals. Much of his subsequent work would be without vocals.

In 1971, under the name Springwater he released the single "I Will Return" which gave him his first hit, reaching No. 5 in the UK, No. 1 in Switzerland and top three in Germany and the Netherlands. The song also reached No. 8 on the New Zealand Listener charts. Under this name he released three more singles as well as his debut album Springwater in 1972, none of these could repeat the success however.

In 1973 (after a one-off single under the name Variation) he reverted to performing under his own name and released a single "Close to You" on Motown spin-off label MoWest Records. Concurrent to this he released another single "Dan the Banjo Man" on another Motown spin-off Rare Earth Records. This single was released under the moniker Dan the Banjo Man and although failed to chart in the UK, became a number one hit in Germany. During 1974 and 1975 he released a number of other singles under both his own name and Dan the Banjo Man, releasing an album under the latter. Around this time he also assisted with production on the Tucky Buzzard album Allright on the Night.

In 1977, under his own name he released another album Born Again, but this would prove to be his last album. After a few more singles in the late 1970s he once again performed under the name Springwater, releasing two singles in 1980. None of these found commercial success however.

Cordell carried on performing and in 2005 recorded a number of new tracks for a CD release of the Dan the Banjo Man album, including a remake of the title track with his son Charlie. Cordell died on 31 March 2007, leaving behind three children.

== Discography ==
Singles

- 1969 "Pumping the Water" b/w "Red Lady" (Warner Bros.)
- 1971 "I Will Return" (as Springwater) (Polydor)
- 1972 "Listen Everybody" (as Springwater) (Polydor)
- 1972 "Amazing Grace" (as Springwater) (Polydor)
- 1972 "Jerusalem" (as Springwater) (Polydor)
- 1973 "Snowbird" (as Variation) (Warner Bros.)
- 1973 "Close to You" (MoWest)
- 1973 "Dan the Banjo Man" (as Dan the Banjo Man) (Rare Earth)
- 1973 "Roadie for the Band" (MoWest)
- 1974 "Laughter in the Rain" (MoWest)
- 1974 "Black Magic" (as Dan the Banjo Man) (Rare Earth)
- 1974 "Flying Trapeze" (as Dan the Banjo Man) (Rare Earth)
- 1974 "Red River Valley" (as Dan the Banjo Man) (Rare Earth)
- 1974 "Cool Clear Water" (MoWest)
- 1975 "Chevvy Van" (MoWest)
- 1977 "Back In Your Arms Again" (Prodigal)
- 1977 "Doin' the Best I Can" (Prodigal)
- 1979 "Hearts on Fire" (Virgin)
- 1979 "Movie Star" (Virgin)
- 1980 "Sailing" (as Springwater) (Fabulous)
- 1980 "Move a Little Closer" (as Springwater) (Fabulous)
- 1981 "Love How You Love Me" (Street Tunes)

Albums

- 1972 Springwater (as Springwater) (Polydor)
- 1974 Dan the Banjo Man (as Dan the Banjo Man) (Rare Earth)
- 1977 Born Again (Prodigal)

== See also ==
- List of number-one singles from 1968 to 1979 (Switzerland)
- List of number-one hits of 1974 (Germany)
