= Martin Drew =

English jazz drummer (1944–2010)

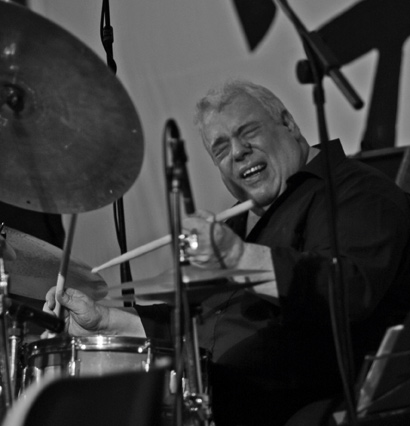
- Drew at the 2008 Appleby Jazz Festival

Background information
- Born: 11 February 1944; Northampton, England
- Died: 29 July 2010 (aged 66) Harefield, Hillingdon, England
- Genres: Jazz
- Occupation: Musician
- Instrument: Drums
- Years active: 1957–2010
- Website: martindrew.co.uk

Martin Drew (11 February 1944 – 29 July 2010) was an English jazz drummer who played with Ronnie Scott between 1975 and 1995 and with Oscar Peterson between 1974 and 2007.

== Career ==
Martin Drew was born on 11 February 1944 in Northampton, England, and started to play the drums when he was six years old. He played his first professional engagement at the age of 13. Studying with drummer George Fierstone gave Drew a solid musical and technical background.

Drew was best known for his extensive work in Oscar Peterson and Ronnie Scott's groups, with which he became an international name. He also played at Ronnie Scott's Jazz Club with many famous visiting American jazz musicians.

Drew was also a member of a trio led by Eddie Thompson. He was often heard playing on BBC Radio 2's Sounds of Jazz programme in the 1970s, which was introduced by Peter Clayton on Sunday evenings.

During the 1980s, Drew and keyboardist John Critchinson played simultaneously with the Ronnie Scott Quartet (the fourth band member was bassist Ron Mathewson) and with the jazz group Morrissey–Mullen. When Morrissey-Mullen disbanded in 1988, Drew led a quintet called Our Band with Dick Morrissey, Jim Mullen (originally Louis Stewart), Critchinson, and Mathewson.

Between 1997 and 2000, Drew led a quartet with Mornington Lockett on tenor saxophone, Gareth Williams on piano, and Laurence Cottle on electric bass.

In 2000, Drew formed the Celebrating The Jazz Couriers quintet with Mornington Lockett. The group played the music of the original Jazz Couriers (1957–59), a group led by Ronnie Scott and Tubby Hayes. This new band was completed by Nigel Hitchcock on tenor saxophone, Steve Melling on piano, and Andrew Cleyndert on double-bass. The group won the 2002 British Jazz Award for Best Small Group.

The New Couriers band reformed in 2003 with Paul Morgan on double-bass and Jim Hart on vibraphone. Lockett and Melling returned on tenor saxophone and piano.

== Musicians worked with ==
Martin Drew himself compiled this list of people he had worked with (alphabetical by first names): Al Cohn - Al Haig - Alan Skidmore - Alec Dankworth - Andrew Cleyndert - Anita O'Day - Anita Wardell - Art Farmer - Arturo Sandoval - Barbara Dennerlein - Barney Kessel - Benn Clatworthy - Benny Carter - Benny Goodman - Bill Holman - Bill Perkins - Bill Watrous - Bobby Hutcherson - Bobby Shew - Bobby Wellins - Bob Wilber - Bosko Petrovic - Buddy Childers - Buddy DeFranco - Bud Shank - Carmen McRae - Charles McPherson - Charlie Mariano - Chet Baker - Chico Freeman - Chucho Valdes - Clark Terry - Conte Candoli - Count Basie - Dame Kiri Te Kanawa - Dave Green - David Gazarov - David Mowatt - Davide Petrocca - Dexter Gordon - Dick Morrissey - Dizzy Gillespie - Eddie Daniels - Eddie "Lockjaw" Davis - Ella Fitzgerald - Frank Rosolino - Frank Wess - Freddy Hubbard - Gareth Williams - Gene Harris - George Coleman - Georgie Fame - Gil Evans - Gregory Fine - Hank Jones - Harold Land - Harry "Sweets" Edison - Herb Ellis - James Moody - James Morrison - Jean Alain Roussel - Jim Hart - Jim Mullen - Jimmy Smith - Jimmy Witherspoon - J.J. Johnson - Joe Henderson - Joe Pass - Joe Temperley - John Altman - John Critchinson - Sir John Dankworth - John Lewis - John Pearce - John Taylor - Johnny Griffin - Julian Joseph - Junior Mance - Ken Peplowski - Kenny Davern - Kenny Werner - Kilian Forster - Laurence Cottle - Laurie Holloway - Lanny Morgan - Lee Konitz - Lew Soloff - Liane Carroll - Manny Albam - Marion Montgomery - Mark Murphy - Michael Brecker - Michel Legrand - Milt Jackson - Monty Alexander - Mornington Lockett - Mundell Lowe - Niels-Henning Ørsted Pedersen - Nigel Hitchcock - Niki Harris - Oscar Peterson - Paul McCartney - Paul Morgan - Peanuts Hucko - Peter King - Phillipe Catherine - Phil Woods - Plas Johnson - Ralph Sutton - Randy Brecker - Ray Brown - Red Holloway - Robert Farnon - Robin Aspland - Roland Hanna - Ron Carter - Ron Mathewson - Ronnie Scott - Roy Eldridge - Ruby Braff - Scott Hamilton - Simon Spillett - Stan Getz - Stanley Turrentine - Stephane Grappelli - Steve Melling - Terence Blanchard - Terry Gibbs - Tete Montoliu - Tommy Smith - Toots Thielemans - Ulf Wakenius - Vic Lewis - Warren Vaché Jr. - Woody Herman - Zoot Sims.

== Death ==
Drew died on 29 July 2010, at the age of 66, following a heart attack.

== Discography ==
=== As leader ===
- 1978: The Martin Drew Band, British Jazz Artists Vol. 3 (Lee Lambert Records)

=== As sideman ===
- 1982: Oscar Peterson and Freddie Hubbard - Face to Face
- 1985: Buddy DeFranco Meets The Oscar Peterson Quartet - Hark
- 1986: Oscar Peterson + Harry Edison + Eddie "Cleanhead" Vinson - Oscar Peterson, Harry "Sweets" Edison and Eddie "Cleanhead" Vinson (Pablo Records)
- 1999: Gregory Fine Trio - Happy Bluesday
- 2007: Gregory Fine Trio - The Hits Of Jazz
- 2007: Gregory Fine Quintet - A Happy Day
