= Jazz Suite Inspired by Dylan Thomas's "Under Milk Wood" =

Studio album by The Stan Tracey Quartet
- Released: 1965
- Recorded: March 14, 1965
- Studios: Lansdowne Studios, London
- Genre: Jazz
- Length: 40:46
- Labels: Columbia, Steam, Blue Note Records, Jazzizit, ReSteamed
- Producer: Denis Preston

Stan Tracey chronology
Little Klunk (1959)	Jazz Suite Inspired by Dylan Thomas's "Under Milk Wood" (1965)	Laughin’ and Scratchin’ (1965)

Alternative cover
- 2010 reissue on ReSteamed Records

Professional ratings
Review scores
Source	Rating
BBC Music Magazine	5/5 stars
The Penguin Guide to Jazz Recordings	4/4 stars
Tom Hull	A

Jazz Suite Inspired by Dylan Thomas's "Under Milk Wood" is an album by the English pianist Stan Tracey and his quartet, that was released by the Columbia subsidiary of EMI in 1965. The music was written in response to the 1953 BBC radio play Under Milk Wood, by the Welsh poet Dylan Thomas. It has often been cited as one of the best jazz recordings made in the United Kingdom.

== Reception ==
In a review of the album for BBC Music Magazine, Chris Parker wrote: "Tracey’s startlingly percussive, eccentric piano style and his close rapport with tenorman Bobby Wellins do bring Thelonious Monk and Charlie Rouse to mind, but the cogent pungency of the compositions (in catchy mid-tempo tunes or in haunting ballads like ‘Starless and Bible Black’ and the title-track) is all his own".

In a series of articles for The Guardian newspaper titled "50 great moments in jazz", John Fordham wrote of the album: "Under Milk Wood was an evocative collection of sparky themes inspired by the Dylan Thomas radio play (it's sometimes performed with a narrator reading the parts). And thanks to Tracey's sparing piano and Wellins's softly hooting sax, the rippling tone-poem 'Starless and Bible Black' is widely acclaimed as one of the great jazz performances".

== Release history ==
Since the original 1965 mono LP on Columbia, the album has been released on a number of labels, including Blue Note. It was first reissued in 1976 on Tracey's own Steam label. The album was later reissued in 2010 on his son, Clark Tracey's ReSteamed Records label, as "Under Milk Wood: Jazz Suite". A live version was recorded in 1976 on RCA records, which included a voice narration from the Welsh actor, Donald Houston.

== Track listing ==
All compositions by Stan Tracey.

1. "Cockle Row" – 6:50
2. "Starless and Bible Black" – 3:45
3. "I Lost My Step in Nantucket" – 3:15
4. "No Good Boyo" – 5:00
5. "Penpals" – 3:45
6. "Llareggub" – 4:50
7. "Under Milk Wood" – 5:55
8. "A.M. Mayhem" – 6:50

== Personnel ==
- Stan Tracey – piano
- Bobby Wellins – tenor saxophone
- Jeff Clyne – bass
- Jackie Dougan – drums
