= Ben Wolfe =

American jazz bassist

- Born: Benjamin Jonah Wolfe; August 3, 1962 (age 64); Baltimore, Maryland, U.S.
- Origin: New York City
- Genre: Jazz
- Occupation: Musician
- Instrument: Double bass
- Years active: 1978–present
- Labels: Mons, Amosaya, Planet Arts, Maxjazz, Posi-tone
- Website: www.benwolfe.com

Benjamin Jonah Wolfe is an American jazz bassist who has performed in groups with Wynton Marsalis, Harry Connick Jr., and Diana Krall. He is currently on the teaching faculty at The Juilliard School Jazz Division.

== Career ==
Wolfe was born in Baltimore and raised in Portland, Oregon. He was a member of his high school band, playing tuba and trombone, and a member of pop music groups in which he played bass guitar. In college he started playing double bass, with some lessons from Ray Brown. In the mid-1980s he went to New York City, where he played with Junior Cook, Dakota Staton, and Duke Jordan. He formed a duo with Harry Connick Jr. in 1988 and became a member of Connick's big band. In the early 1990s he toured and recorded with Wynton Marsalis's septet and then became part of Marsalis's Lincoln Center Jazz Orchestra in 1995. He has also played with Wynton's brother, Branford Marsalis, in addition to Frank Kimbrough, Marcus Roberts, and Mary Stallings. In 1997 he went on tour with singer Diana Krall. He has been teaching jazz at The Juilliard School since 2002.

== Discography ==
As leader

- 1996 13 Sketches (Mons)
- 1998 Bagdad Theater (Mons) – rec. 1997
- 2001 Murray's Cadillac (Amosaya) – rec. 2000
- 2004 My Kinda Beautiful (Planet Arts)
- 2008 No Strangers Here (Maxjazz)
- 2010 Live at Smalls (SmallsLIVE)
- 2013 From Here I See (Maxjazz)
- 2015 The Whisperer (Posi-Tone)
- 2019 Fatherhood (Resident Arts)
- 2023 Unjust (Resident Arts)
