= Thilo Berg =

German drummer

- Born: 23 April 1959 (age 66); Dortmund, Germany
- Genres: Jazz
- Occupations: Musician, record producer, label owner
- Instrument: Drums
- Years active: 1981–present
- Labels: Mons

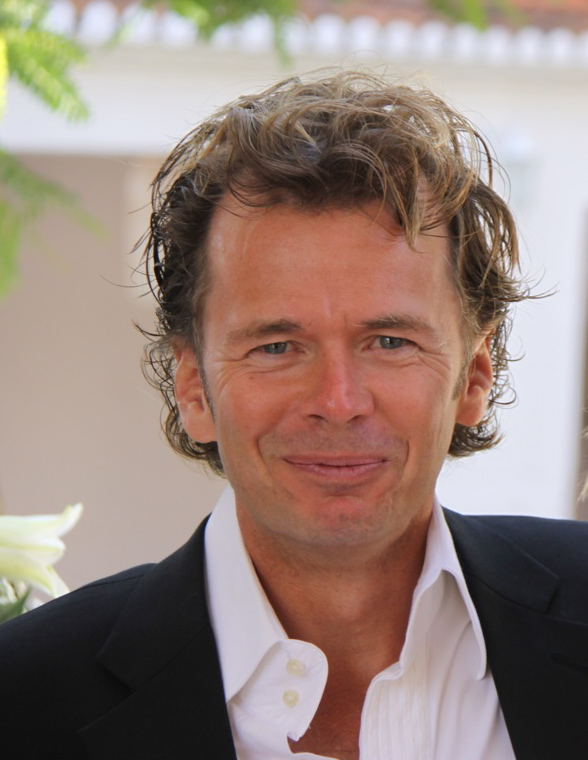
Thilo Berg

Thilo Berg (born 23 April 1959) is a German drummer who led a big band in the 1980s. He has produced more than 700 jazz, classical, R&B, and soul events. Besides his own productions, he worked on concerts, meetings, and social events. He founded Mons Records.

== Career ==
Thilo Berg completed studies as a classical percussionist with Herrmann Gschwendtner and was a solo timpanist and percussionist in the Southwest German Radio Symphony Orchestra between 1981 and 2007. He also held the same position at the German Radio Philharmonic Orchestra until 2008. In addition to this, Berg worked in various bands. In 1986 he formed his big band and worked with guest soloists such as Barbara Dennerlein, Ack van Rooyen, Jiggs Whigham, Barbara Morrison, Silvia Droste, Jim Snidero, Slide Hampton, Bob Mintzer, Art Farmer and Bill Ramsey.

Together until 1993, the band included musicians such as Till Brönner, Paul Heller, Peter Weniger, Ludwig Nuss, Mark Nightingale, Gerald Presencer and Martin Shaw, as well as the pianist Hubert Nuss and Thilo Wagner.

The work of the big band was documented on three albums. Berg also worked in smaller groups with musicians such as: Jack van Poll, Bobby Shew, Heiner Franz, John Gordon, Elaine Delmare and Curtis Fuller.

Thilo Berg founded the jazz and classical music label Mons Records in Trippstadt in 1991, and has worked as a music producer for Sony Music, BMG, Columbia and Universal. Mons Records released around fifteen albums a year.
