= Allright on the Night =

Studio album by Tucky Buzzard
- Released: May 1973 UK October 1973 US
- Genre: Hard rock, blues rock
- Length: 30:27
- Label: Purple
- Producer: Bill Wyman

Tucky Buzzard chronology
Coming On Again (1972)	Allright on the Night (1973)	Buzzard (1973)

Allright on the Night is the fourth album by the British hard rock band Tucky Buzzard. It was released on Deep Purple's record label "Purple Records", and was produced by The Rolling Stones' bass player Bill Wyman. The album artwork is a picture of vocalist Jimmy Henderson sitting in front of a painted pub wall.

== Track listing ==
All tracks are written by Terry Taylor and Jimmy Henderson, except where noted

Side one
No.	Title	Writer(s)	Length
1.	"Can't Live Without It"	T. Taylor, Henderson, Dave Brown	3:59
2.	"Fast Bluesy Woman"	T. Taylor, Henderson, Brown, Chris Johnson	3:30
3.	"Gold Medallions"		3:28
4.	"All I Want Is Your Love"		3:41

Side two
No.	Title	Writer(s)	Length
1.	"Rainbow Rider"	T. Taylor, Henderson, Brown	4:24
2.	"Rudie Movie Star"	Paul Kendrick	4:01
3.	"Pictures"		3:31
4.	"Last War"		5:13

Songwriting credits are per BMI records. Credits on the album itself do not differentiate between Terry Taylor and Ron Taylor, and also give inconsistent credits for "Rainbow Rider" (the sleeve gives "Taylor/Henderson", but the record label gives "Taylor/Henderson/Brown").

== Personnel ==
Tucky Buzzard

- Jimmy Henderson - lead vocals, Blues harp
- Terry Taylor - lead, slide, rhythm, and acoustic guitars
- David Brown - bass, acoustic guitar
- Chris Johnson - drums, percussion
- Ron Taylor - guitar

Special thanks to

- Paul Kendrick - rhythm guitar
- Jeff Workman - piano
- Phil Cordell - piano, assistant producer
- Don Weller - brass
- Bob Patterson - "Beer, fags & moans"
- Tony Whibley - outer sleeve photography
- Alex Marshall - artwork
- Mick Rock - photography
- Jeremy Gee - engineer
- Robin Thompson - remix engineer

All songs recorded by Buzz Music Ltd. and Almo Music, Inc. (ASCAP)

A product of Purple Records, Ltd. (UK)
