= John Critchinson =

English jazz pianist (1934–2017)

Background information
- Born: John William Frank Critchinson; 24 December 1934; London, England
- Died: 15 December 2017 (aged 82)
- Genre: Jazz
- Occupation: Musician
- Instrument: piano
- Years active: 1970s–2017

John William Frank Critchinson (24 December 1934 – 15 December 2017) also known as "Critch", was an English jazz pianist.

== Biography ==
Critchinson was born in London in 1934. He worked as a part-time musician with Ronnie Scott, Tubby Hayes, and Jimmy Deuchar, among others. In 1979, at the recommendation of his mentor, Bill Le Sage, he was a member of Ronnie Scott's Quartet until it folded in 1995. During that time, he worked with many visiting American artists, including Chet Baker, George Coleman, James Moody, Joe Henderson and Johnny Griffin.

In the early 1980s, he was associated with the British jazz fusion duo Morrissey–Mullen, appearing on two of their albums. He recorded with Dick Morrissey and was a member of Martin Drew's Our Band, with Ron Mathewson, Jim Mullen, and Dick Morrissey.

In 1995, Critchinson formed a quartet with Art Themen on saxophone, Dave Green on bass and Dave Barry on drums. When Scott died in 1996, Critchinson formed the Ronnie Scott Legacy with Pat Crumly on saxophone and flute. Later in his life, he played and recorded with saxophonist Simon Spillett.

== Discography ==
- Summer Afternoon (Coda, 1982)
- New Night (Coda, 1984)
- Ulyssess & the Cyclops (Coda, 1984)
- Where's the Tune, Johnny?
- First Moves (Jazz House, 1995)
- Excuse Me, Do I Know You: A Tribute to Ronnie Scott (Jazz House, 1999)
- With a Song in My Heart (2002)
- Introducing Simon Spillett (2007)
- Remove All Cover (33 Jazz, 2007)
- Sienna Red, Simon Spillett (2008)
- Square One, Simon Spillett (2013)
