= Soundtrack (Guy Barker album) =

Studio album by Guy Barker
- Released: 2001
- Genre: Jazz
- Label: Provocateur Records

Guy Barker chronology
Timeswing (2000)	Soundtrack (2001)	The Amadeus Project (2007)

Professional ratings
Review scores
Source	Rating
The Penguin Guide to Jazz Recordings	4/4 stars

Soundtrack is a 2001 album by jazz trumpeter Guy Barker. The album was nominated for the 2002 Mercury Music Prize.

== Track listing ==
1. "Underdogs"
2. "Nature Boy"
3. "Waiting for the Delay"
4. "Purr"
5. "Susannah's Song"
6. "Izzatso!"
7. "Queen of the Night"
8. "Sounds in Black and White"
