= The Murmuring Coast =

2004 film

- Directed by: Margarida Cardoso
- Starring: Beatriz Batarda; Filipe Duarte
- Music by: Bernardo Sassetti
- Release date: 11 September 2004 (VFF)
- Running time: 120 min
- Country: Portugal
- Language: Portuguese

The Murmuring Coast (Portuguese: A Costa dos Murmúrios) is a 2004 Portuguese drama film directed by Margarida Cardoso based on a novel by Lídia Jorge.

== Plot ==
On the coast of an unnamed Portuguese colony (though unmistakably Mozambique) in the early 1960s,Evita, a young and impulsive newlywed, arrives at an idyllic coastal resort to marry Luis, a mathematics student completing his military service there. She soon discovers that the colonial war has transformed her fiancé: the rebellious and ambitious young man she knew in Lisbon is now a "pale, bossy copy of his commander, Forza Leal."

When the men set off to fight, Luis orders Evita not to leave her hotel room, but she ventures out to explore the town and discovers the seamy side of colonial life: corpses of black people no one cares about wash up on the beach of this tropical paradise, and journalists reveal to her the cruelty of the army. In her wanderings she meets Helena, the beautiful and humiliated wife of Forza Leal — nicknamed "Helen of Troy" — whose company tells her more about Luis than she wants to know. Amid the bright but gritty heat of the colony, the film portrays "dying colonial ambitions, hypocrisy, and the tired routine attitude to the violent course of events of the era."
