= Tucky Buzzard (album) =

Studio album by Tucky Buzzard
- Released: September 26, 1971
- Recorded: 1969 – January 1971
- Studios: Olympic Studios, London
- Genres: Hard rock, blues rock
- Length: 39:29
- Label: Capitol
- Producer: Bill Wyman

Tucky Buzzard chronology
Coming on Again (1971)	Tucky Buzzard (1971)	Warm Slash (1971)

Tucky Buzzard is the second studio album by British hard rock band Tucky Buzzard and their first for Capitol Records. It was produced by the Rolling Stones' bass player Bill Wyman. The album was featured on the band's 2005 compilation album Time Will Be Your Doctor - Rare Recordings 1971-1972 in its entirety.

"Time Will Be Your Doctor" was also recorded by Fuzzy Duck for their self-titled debut album released the same year.

== Track listing ==
Side one
No.	Title	Writer(s)	Length
1.	"Time Will Be Your Doctor"	Paul Francis, Nicky Graham, David Leonard Brown	3:50
2.	"Stainless Steel Lady"	Graham, Brown, Jimmy Henderson, Terry Taylor	4:28
3.	"Sally Shotgun"	Brown, Taylor	3:06
4.	"Gu Gu Gu"	Graham, Brown, Taylor	3:26
5.	"My Friend"	Francis, Graham, Brown, Taylor	3:57

Side two
No.	Title	Writer(s)	Length
1.	"Pisces Apple Lady"	Leon Russell	2:50
2.	"She's Meat"	Graham, Brown, Henderson, Taylor	3:15
3.	"Ace The Face"	Francis, Graham, Brown, Henderson, Taylor	3:19
4.	"Whiskey Eyes"	Francis, Graham, Brown, Henderson, Taylor	5:50
5.	"Rolling Cloud"	Henderson, Taylor	5:17

Songwriting credits per BMI records. The original album does not provide specific songwriting credits, and instead ambiguously credits all the original songs as "written by Tucky Buzzard", even though some of the tracks were co-written by Paul Francis, who was no longer a member of the group.

== Personnel ==
Tucky Buzzard

- Jimmy Henderson - lead vocals on "Stainless Steel Lady", "Pisces Apple Lady", "She's Meat", "Ace the Face", "Whisky Eyes" and "Rolling Cloud"
- Terry Taylor - guitars
- Nicky Graham - keyboards; lead vocals on "Time Will Be Your Doctor" and "Gu Gu Gu"
- Dave Brown - bass; lead vocals on "Sally Shotgun" and "My Friend"
- Chris Johnson - drums

with:

- Mick Taylor - guitar on "My Friend" and "Whiskey Eyes"
