= Ron Mathewson =

British jazz musician (1944–2020)

- Born: Rognvald Andrew Mathewson; 19 February 1944; Lerwick, Scotland
- Origin: Lerwick, Shetland, Scotland
- Died: 3 December 2020 (aged 76) London, England
- Genres: Jazz
- Instruments: Double bass; bass guitar
- Formerly of: Gordon Beck

Rognvald Andrew Mathewson (19 February 1944 – 3 December 2020) was a British jazz double bassist and bass guitarist.

During his career, Mathewson performed with Ronnie Scott, but also recorded with Stan Getz, Joe Henderson, Joan Armatrading, Ben Webster, Philly Joe Jones, Roy Eldridge, Oscar Peterson and Bill Evans.

== Biography ==
Mathewson was born in Lerwick, Shetland Islands, into an unusually musical household. At eight years of age, he was studying classical piano. He continued to study and perform classical piano until he reached the age of 16, having started playing bass guitar a year earlier. His talent was noted and encouraged by the Shetland musician Peerie Willie Johnson.

In 1962, Mathewson was in Germany, playing professionally with a band that played Dixieland music. In London, he performed with various jazz and R&B bands throughout the early 1960s. Around this time, he was also a member of The Kenny Clarke-Francy Boland Big Band. In 1966, Mathewson became a member of the Tubby Hayes band, with which he performed until 1973. From 1975 on into the 1990s, Mathewson was frequently a participant in Ronnie Scott's recordings and concerts. In 1983, he appeared on his old friend Dick Morrissey's solo album, After Dark, with Jim Mullen, John Critchinson, Martin Drew and Barry Whitworth.

On 11 February 2007, a benefit concert was held for Mathewson, who was reportedly recovering from two broken hips, a broken wrist and a ruptured artery.

The newsletter of the Vortex Jazz Club reported on 4 December 2020, that Mathewson had died the previous day, after suffering from COVID-19 in London during the pandemic in England.

== Discography ==
With Tubby Hayes

- For Members Only (Live) (Miles Music)
- Mexican Green (Fontana)

With Philly Joe Jones

- Trailways Express (Black Lion, 1968 [1971])

With John Taylor

- Reverie (Vinyl Records)

With Gordon Beck

- Seven Steps to Evans w/ Tony Oxley & Kenny Wheeler (MPS)
- All in the Morning (Jaguar)
- Jazz Trio (Musica)
- Gordon Beck's Gyroscope: One, Two, Three....Go! (Jaguar)

With Ronnie Scott

- Live At Ronnie Scott's (CBS)
- Serious Gold (Pye)

With Phil Woods and His European Rhythm Machine

- Live at Montreux 72 (Les Disques Pierre Cardin)

With John Stevens

- Blue (Culture Press)

With Terry Smith

- Fall Out (Philips)

With Kenny Clarke

- Rue Chaptal (MPS)

With Kenny Wheeler

- Song for Someone (Incus, 1973)

With Acoustic Alchemy

- Early Alchemy (GRP)

With Ian Carr

- Solar Plexus (Vertigo)

With the Spontaneous Music Ensemble

- The Source: From and Towards (Tangent)
- Live Big Band and Quartet (Vinyl)

With The Chitinous Ensemble

- Chitinous (Deram)

With Stan Sulzmann

- On Loan with Gratitude (Mosaic)

With Rollercoaster

- Wonderin' (1980)

With Ray Nance

- Huffin'n'Puffin' (1971)

With Charles Tolliver

- Impact (Enja, 1972)
