= List of number-one hits of 1974 (Germany) =

This is a list of the German Media Control Top100 Singles Chart number-ones of 1974.

Issue date	Song	Artist
4 January	"La Paloma Ade"	Mireille Mathieu
11 January	"I'd Love You to Want Me"	Lobo
18 January	"I'd Love You to Want Me"	Lobo
25 January	"I'd Love You to Want Me"	Lobo
1 February	"I'd Love You to Want Me"	Lobo
8 February	"I'd Love You to Want Me"	Lobo
15 February	"Teenage Rampage"	Sweet
22 February	"Teenage Rampage"	Sweet
1 March	"Teenage Rampage"	Sweet
8 March	"Teenage Rampage"	Sweet
15 March	"Teenage Rampage"	Sweet
22 March	"Teenage Rampage"	Sweet
29 March	"Dan the Banjo Man"	Dan the Banjo Man
5 April	"Teenage Rampage"	Sweet
12 April	"This Flight Tonight"	Nazareth
19 April	"Seasons in the Sun"	Terry Jacks
26 April	"Seasons in the Sun"	Terry Jacks
3 May	"Seasons in the Sun"	Terry Jacks
10 May	"Seasons in the Sun"	Terry Jacks
17 May	"Seasons in the Sun"	Terry Jacks
24 May	"Seasons in the Sun"	Terry Jacks
31 May	"Seasons in the Sun"	Terry Jacks
7 June	"Waterloo"	ABBA
14 June	"Seasons in the Sun"	Terry Jacks
21 June	"Waterloo"	ABBA
28 June	"Waterloo"	ABBA
5 July	"Waterloo"	ABBA
12 July	"Sugar Baby Love"	The Rubettes
19 July	"Sugar Baby Love"	The Rubettes
26 July	"Theo, wir Fahr’n Nach Lodz"	Vicky Leandros
2 August	"Sugar Baby Love"	The Rubettes
9 August	"Sugar Baby Love"	The Rubettes
16 August	"Sugar Baby Love"	The Rubettes
23 August	"Sugar Baby Love"	The Rubettes
30 August	"Rock Your Baby"	George McCrae
6 September	"Rock Your Baby"	George McCrae
13 September	"Rock Your Baby"	George McCrae
20 September	"Rock Your Baby"	George McCrae
27 September	"Rock Your Baby"	George McCrae
4 October	"Rock Your Baby"	George McCrae
11 October	"Rock Your Baby"	George McCrae
18 October	"Rock Your Baby"	George McCrae
25 October	"Rock Your Baby"	George McCrae
1 November	"Rock Your Baby"	George McCrae
8 November	"Kung Fu Fighting"	Carl Douglas
15 November	"Kung Fu Fighting"	Carl Douglas
22 November	"Kung Fu Fighting"	Carl Douglas
29 November	"Kung Fu Fighting"	Carl Douglas
6 December	"Kung Fu Fighting"	Carl Douglas
13 December	"Kung Fu Fighting"	Carl Douglas
20 December	"Kung Fu Fighting"	Carl Douglas
27 December	"Tränen Lügen Nicht"	Michael Holm

== See also ==
- List of number-one hits (Germany)
