= Tina May =

British jazz vocalist (1961–2022)

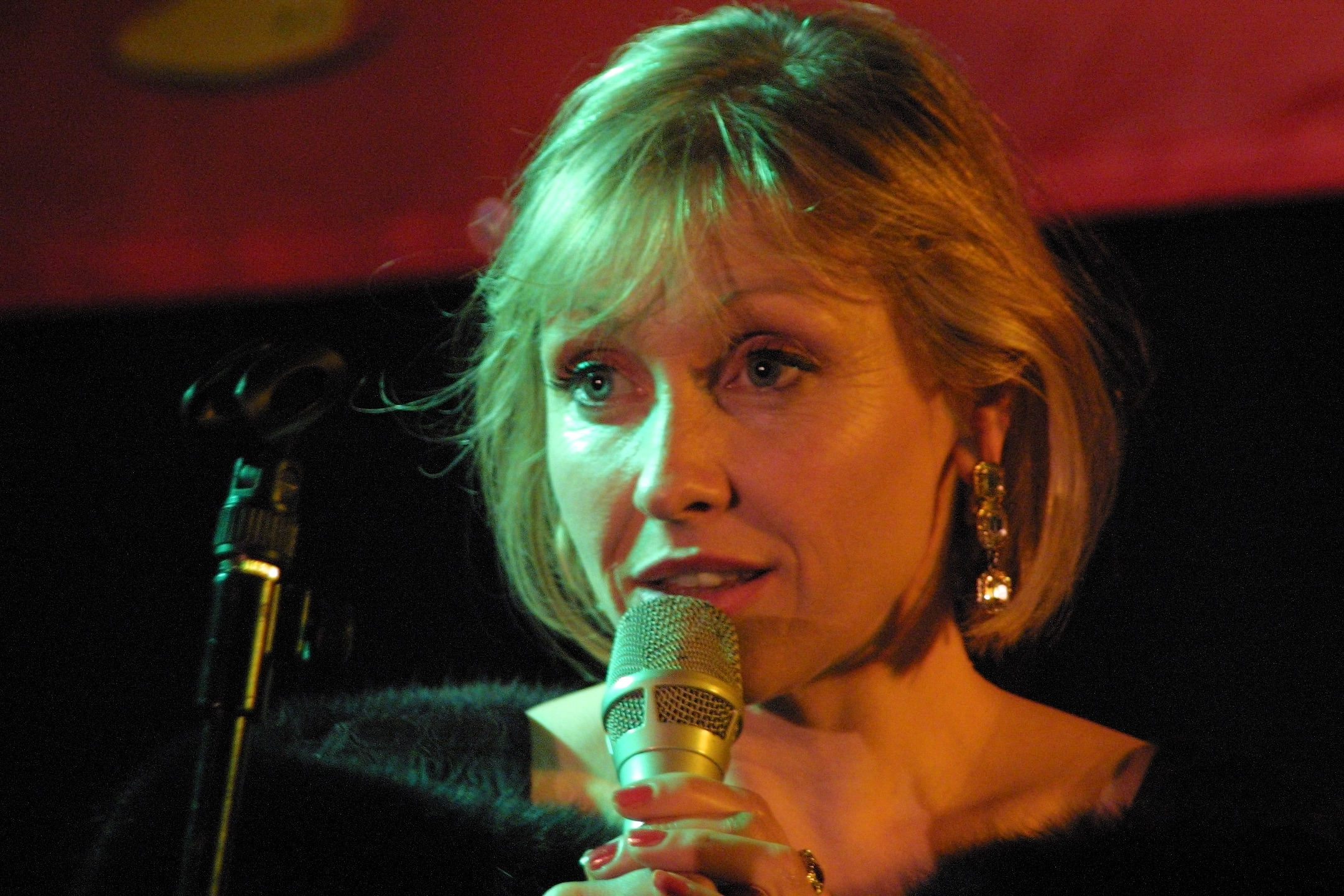
- Tina May performing at the Blue Lamp, Aberdeen, 2004

Background information
- Born: Daphne Christina May; 30 March 1961; Gloucester, Gloucestershire, England
- Died: 26 March 2022 (aged 60) Leighton Buzzard, Bedfordshire, England
- Genre: Jazz
- Occupations: Singer, actress
- Years active: 1980–2022
- Labels: 33 Jazz, Linn, Hep

Daphne Christina May (30 March 1961 – 26 March 2022), known professionally as Tina May, was an English jazz vocalist.

== Early life and career ==
Daphne Christina May was born in Gloucester on 30 March 1961. The younger of two daughters of Harry May and Daphne E. Walton, May lived in Frampton-on-Severn when she was young and attended Stroud High School and later Cheltenham Ladies' College. She played clarinet from an early age, before studying classical singing at Cheltenham. She began singing jazz while attending Cardiff University. May recorded numerous albums for 33 Jazz Records. She also worked with Tony Coe, Nikki Iles, Stan Sulzmann, Ray Bryant, Enrico Pieranunzi, Patrick Villanueva and with Ray Guntrip, on three albums, including her final studio outing, Mood In Blue, which was released in 2023.(see discography below).

May also lectured and taught extensively; her employers included Trinity College of Music, Leeds College of Music, Birmingham Conservatoire, the Royal Academy of Music, the Royal Welsh College of Music and Drama, and the University of West London. In addition, she regularly attached workshops and masterclasses to her own tours.

== Personal life and death ==
In 1989, May married Clark Tracey, with whom she recorded several albums in the 1990s. They later divorced and, at the time of her death, May's partner of roughly two and a half years was saxophonist Simon Spillett.

May was diagnosed with a brain tumour in late 2021. She died at home in Leighton Buzzard, Bedfordshire, on 26 March 2022, aged 60.

== Discography ==
=== As leader ===
- Never Let Me Go (33 Records, 1992)
- Fun (33 Records, 1993)
- It Ain't Necessarily So (33 Records, 1994)
- Time Will Tell (33 Records, 1995)
- Jazz Piquant with Tony Coe (33 Records, 1998)
- Change of Sky with Nikki Iles (33 Records, 1998)
- One Fine Day (33 Records, 1999)
- Live in Paris (33 Records, 2000)
- The Ella Fitzgerald Songbook Revisted with Lee Gibson, Barbara Jay (Spotlite, 2000)
- I'll Take Romance (Linn, 2003)
- Early May (33 Records, 2004)
- More Than You Know with Tony Coe, Nikki Iles (33 Records, 2004)
- A Wing and a Prayer (33 Records, 2006)
- Sings the Ray Bryant Songbook (33 Records, 2006)
- Out of the Blue with Ray Guntrip (rayguntripmusic, 2008)
- I Never Told You (33 Records, 2009)
- Tina May Sings Piaf (33 Records, 2011)
- Where You Belong with Ray Guntrip (rayguntripmusic, 2011)
- No More Hanky Panky (33 Records, 2011)
- Troubadours with Dylan Fowler (33 Records, 2013)
- Divas (Hep, 2013)
- My Kinda Love (Hep, 2014)
- Home Is Where the Heart Is with Enrico Pieranunzi (33 Records, 2015)
- Musica Paradiso: Songs and Stories from the Silver Screen with Guillermo Rozenthuler (2016)
- Telling Jokes with Steve Plews (ASC, 2016)
- Cafe Paranoia: Tina May Sings Mark Murphy with Andy Lutter (33 Records, 2017)
- 52nd Street: Tina May Sings the Songs of Duncan Lamont (33 Records, 2021)
- Mood In Blue by Ray Guntrip & Tina May (DigiMix Records Ltd - DGMX 594, 2023) (Vocals recorded August, 2021 and co-produced by Gary Barnacle)

=== As guest ===
- Transatlantic Airs with Michael Hashim (33 Jazz, 1994)
- Ellington's Sacred Music with Stan Tracey Jazz Orchestra & the Durham Cathedral Choir (33 Jazz, 2000)
- Cornucopia 2 with Humphrey Lyttelton (Caligraph, 2007)
- I'm Sorry, I Haven't a Clue: Humph Celebration Concert (AudioGO, 2011)
