= Clark Tracey =

British jazz drummer (born 1961)

- Born: 5 February 1961 (age 65); London, England
- Genres: Jazz
- Occupation: Musician
- Instrument: Drums
- Years active: 1978–present
- Labels: Stray Horn, Tentoten, Resteamed
- Website: clarktracey.com

Clark Tracey BEM (born 5 February 1961) is a British jazz drummer, band leader, and composer.

== Early life ==
Tracey was born in London, England. He first played piano and vibraphone before switching to drums at age 13, studying under Bryan Spring.

== Career ==
Tracey played in several ensembles with his father Stan Tracey (1978–2013), including a quartet called Fathers and Sons with John and Alec Dankworth in the 1990s. In addition to his extensive work with his father, which took him to the US, Australia, India, The Middle East, South America, Africa and Europe, Tracey has played with numerous visiting American musicians, notably Bud Shank, Johnny Griffin, Red Rodney, Sal Nistico, Conte Candoli, Barney Kessell, John Hicks and Pharoah Sanders throughout his career. He also worked and recorded with Buddy DeFranco and Martin Taylor (1984–86), then with Charlie Rouse (1988), Alan Skidmore in Hong Kong (1989), Tommy Smith (1989), and Claire Martin (1991-2004). In 2011 he replaced Tony Levin in the European Jazz Ensemble and toured and recorded with them until 2017.

He has led his own ensembles since the early 1980s; in these combos he has played with Django Bates, Iain Ballamy, Guy Barker, Jamie Talbot, Mark Nightingale, Dave O'Higgins, Steve Melling, Nigel Hitchcock, Gerard Presencer, Mornington Lockett, Simon Allen, Kit Downes and Zoe Rahman. As a bandleader he has had two tours of the Far East, Yugoslavia, France, Gibraltar and Finland as well as many national UK tours. Now concentrating on promoting the music of his late father, Clark also began a quintet of more mature and established UK musicians in 2024, called The Jazz Champions. Clark has worked steadily as a freelance musician and regularly appears in the groups of Alan Barnes.

He has been awarded "Best Drums" in the British Jazz Awards six times and in 2007 won "Best Drums" at the Ronnie Scott's Club Awards and his quintet won the Best Performance Award for Birmingham Jazz in 2006.

Tracey took over promotions for Herts Jazz in 2009 and ran a weekly jazz club in St Albans and an annual jazz festival up until the end of 2021. He owns three record labels, Stray Horn Records, Tentoten Records and Resteamed Records, the latter dedicated to re-issues on CD of his father's recordings. Clark Tracey has been commissioned to write Exploring Jazz Drums for Schott Publishing, an instructional book, and The Godfather of British Jazz for Equinox Publishing, a biography of Stan Tracey. Previously a tutor at the Purcell School of Music, he was a visiting tutor at the Royal Birmingham Conservatoire of Music for 15 years until June 2024, and was also asked to compose the Trinity College jazz drums grades for 2020–2024. In 2020 he was commissioned to compose and prepare the first drum grades syllabus in China. He has recently been invited as Musician in Residence at the Maltese Music Academy.

== Awards ==
Tracey was awarded the British Empire Medal (BEM) in the 2019 Birthday Honours for services to music and the promotion of jazz. Tracey has won the "Best Drums" category six times in the British Jazz Awards.

== Stage and film ==
- The Talented Mr. Ripley, directed by Anthony Minghella, film
- Lady Day, starring Dee Dee Bridgewater, West End play
- Lenny, starring Eddie Izzard, directed by Sir Peter Hall, West End play

== Discography ==
=== As leader ===
- Suddenly Last Tuesday (Cadillac, 1986)
- Stiperstones (Steam, 1987)
- We've Been Expecting You (33 Jazz, 1992)
- Full Speed Sideways (33 Jazz, 1994)
- Stability (Linn, 2000)
- The Calling (Tentoten, 2003)
- British Standard Time (Tentoten, 2005)
- The Mighty Sas (Tentoten, 2006)
- Given Time (Tentoten, 2008)
- Current Climate (Tentoten, 2008)
- Special Septet with Steve Melling (Melljazz, 2011)
- Meantime (Tentoten, 2014)
- Bootleg Eric with David Newton (ASC, 2015)
- Jubilation (Tentoten, 2016)
- No Doubt (Tentoten, 2018)
- The Legacy with Dominic Galea (Heritage, 2022)

=== As sideman ===
With Stan Tracey

- South East Assignment (Steam, 1980)
- The Crompton Suite (Steam, 1981)
- Stan Tracey Now (Steam, 1983)
- The Poets' Suite (Steam, 1984)
- Live at Ronnie Scotts (Steam, 1986)
- Genesis (Steam, 1987)
- We Still Love You Madly (Mole, 1989)
- Portraits Plus (Blue Note, 1992)
- Live at the QEH (Blue Note, 1994)
- For Heaven's Sake (Cadillac, 1996)
- Solo: Trio (Cadillac, 1998)
- Comme D'Habitude (Jazzizit, 1998)
- The Durham Connection (33 Jazz, 1999)
- Seventy Something (Trio, 2004)
- Let Them Crevulate (Trio, 2006)
- Live At Appleby (ReSteamed, 2007)
- Play Monk with Bobby Wellins (ReSteamed, 2008)
- Senior Moment (ReSteamed, 2009)
- The Later Works (ReSteamed, 2010)
- A Child's Christmas Jazz Suite (ReSteamed, 2011)
- Sound Check (ReSteamed, 2011)
- The Flying Pig (ReSteamed, 2013)

With Steve Waterman

- Stablemates (Mainstem, 2004)
- Our Delight (Mainstem, 2006)
- Night Lights (Mainstem, 2008)

With Claire Martin

- The Waiting Game (Linn, 1992)
- Devil May Care (Linn, 1993)
- Old Boyfriends (Linn, 1994)
- Off Beat (Linn, 1995)
- Take My Heart (Linn, 1999)
- Too Darn Hot! (Linn, 2002)
- Secret Love (Linn 2004)
- He Never Mentioned Love (Linn, 2007)

With Colin Towns

- Mask Orchestra (The Jazz Label 1993)
- Nowhere & Heaven (Provocateur, 1996)
- Bolt from the Blue (Provocateur, 1997)

With Tina May

- Never Let Me Go (33 Jazz, 1992)
- Fun (33 Jazz, 1993)
- It Ain't Necessarily So (33 Jazz, 1994)
- Time Will Tell... (33 Jazz, 1995)

With others

- Dominic Alldis, If Love Were All (Canzona, 2000)
- Guy Barker, Holly J. (Miles Music, 1989)
- Guy Barker, Guy Barker's Extravaganza - Isn't It? (Spotlite, 1993)
- Alan Barnes, The Sherlock Holmes Suite (Woodville Records, 2003)
- Alan Barnes, Seven Ages Of Jazz (Woodville Records, 2006)
- Alan Barnes, A Jazz Christmas Carol (Woodville Records, 2015)
- Alan Barnes, Copperfield (Woodville Records, 2022)
- Iva Bittova, Iva Bittova (Indies, 2002)
- Harry Bolt, Piece By Piece (Selective, 2018)
- Daniela Clynes, Gentle Persuasion (2004)
- Laurence Cottle, Jazz! (KPM Music, 2001)
- Dunstan Coulber, I'll Be Around (Nagel Heyer, 2004)
- Buddy DeFranco, Groovin (Hep, 1985)
- Buddy DeFranco, Garden of Dreams (ProJazz, 1988)
- European Jazz Ensemble, 35th Anniversary Tour 2011 (Konnex, 2011)
- Greg Foat, The Mage (Athens Of The North, 2019)
- Greg Foat, The Dreaming Jewels (Athens Of The North, 2019)
- Greg Foat, Symphonie Pacifique (Strut, 2020)
- Hampshire & Foat, Galaxies Like Grains Of Sand (Athens Of The North, 2017)
- Hampshire & Foat, Nightshade (Athens Of The North, 2018)
- Hampshire & Foat, The Honey Bear (Athens Of The North, 2018)
- John Harle, The Shadow of the Duke (EMI, 1992)
- Gary Husband, From The Heart (Jazzizit 1999)
- Benjamin Herman & Stan Tracey, The London Session (Dox, 2006)
- Roger Kellaway, Lenny by Julian Barry (Send in the New Boy, 1999)
- Angie Mills, Too Much In Love To Care (AMCD, 2000)
- Derek Nash, Setting New Standards (Jazzizit, 1998)
- David Newton, Victim of Circumstance (Linn, 1990)
- Sal Nistico & Stan Tracey, Live in London (Steam, 1985)
- Bernard O'Neill, Echoes & Whispers (Deadly-Disc Music, 2001)
- Charlie Rouse, Playin' in the Yard (Steam, 1987)
- Alan Skidmore, East to West (Miles Music, 1992)
- Simon Spillett, Square One (Gearbox, 2013)
- Warren Vaché & Alan Barnes, Memories of You (Zephyr, 1999)
- Warren Vache, Tony Coe, Alan Barnes, Jumpin (Zephyr, 1999)
- Bobby Wellins, The Satin Album (Jazzizit, 1996)
- Bob Wilber, Bean: Bob Wilber's Tribute to Coleman Hawkins (Arbors, 1995)
- Norma Winstone, Stan Tracey, Bobby Wellins, Amoroso...Only More So (Trio, 2007)
- Samuel Yirga, Guzo (Real World 2012)

== Other sources ==
- Mark Gilbert, "Clark Tracey". Grove Jazz online.
