= Alan Barnes (musician) =

English jazz saxophone and clarinet player

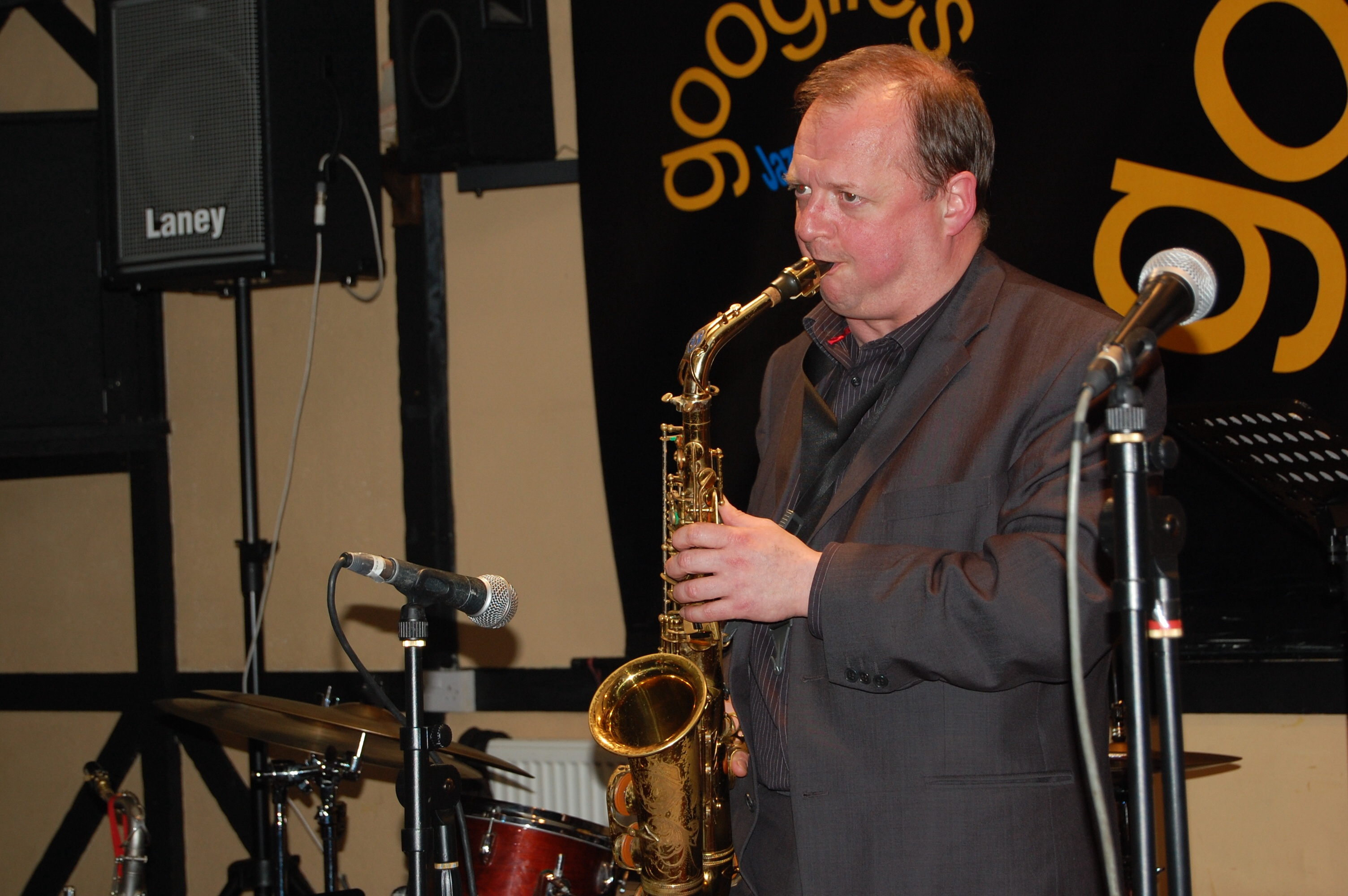

Background information
- Born: 23 July 1959 (age 66); Altrincham, England
- Genres: Jazz
- Occupation: Musician
- Instruments: Clarinet; Saxophone
- Years active: 1980–present
- Website: alan-barnes.co.uk

Alan Barnes (born 23 July 1959) is an English jazz saxophone and clarinet player.

== Career ==
Between 1977 and 1980, Barnes attended Leeds College of Music, where he studied saxophone, woodwinds and arranging before moving to London. In 1980, he played with the Midnight Follies Orchestra and the following year was with the Pasadena Roof Orchestra, touring Europe until 1983. In that year he left to join the hard-bop band of Tommy Chase, where he attracted attention on the UK jazz scene for the first time. He left Chase in 1986 to co-lead The Jazz Renegades, with rock drummer Steve White, with whom he recorded four albums.

In 1985, he recorded his first record as co-leader with Tommy Whittle (entitled Straight Eight) and as leader of his own quartet in 1987, Affiliation, with pianist David Newton, an association that goes back to their days at Leeds College of Music. In 1988, Barnes was asked to fill the chair recently vacated by Bruce Turner in the Humphrey Lyttelton band where he stayed until 1992. Between 1987 and 1997, he also led the Pizza Express Modern Jazz Sextet, with Gerard Presencer and Dave O’Higgins. After leaving the Humphrey Lyttelton band, he concentrated on a freelance career. In 1993, he recorded again with Newton, resulting in the duo album Like Minds and the quartet, quintet and sextet album Thirsty Work, which featured fellow reedmen Andy Panayi and Iain Dixon. Throughout the 1990s he co-led a quintet with be-bop trumpeter Bruce Adams, recording two CDs for Big Bear Records, Side-Steppin' and Lets Face the Music, and later The Marbella Jazz Suite as part of the specially assembled Alan Barnes All Stars ensemble.

During 1997–99, Barnes began to record a large number of sessions with pianist Brian Lemon on the Zephyr label, including albums with Warren Vache, Ken Peplowski, Tony Coe, Roy Williams and his own octet and nonet. He performed as a member of Clark Tracey's Tribute to Art Blakey and was featured on the David Newton/Clark Tracey recording Bootleg Eric.

In 1999, he toured America and Europe with Bryan Ferry's band, returning to the United States in early 2000 to record and tour for ten weeks with Warren Vache's eleven-piece band - a project for which Barnes had written most of the arrangements. A band with Don Weller, celebrating the music of Cannonball Adderley, recorded a live album Cannonball which was awarded album of the year in the 2001 British Jazz Awards. In the same year he received the BBC Jazz Instrumentalist of the Year award. That November Barnes featured on baritone at the Blue Note Clubs in New York and Tokyo with the Charlie Watts Tentet and followed this with a stay in South Africa as a solo artist.

A regular broadcaster over a ten-year period with the BBC Big Band and Radio Orchestra, he has toured and recorded with big band leaders, Dick Walter, Kenny Baker, Bob Wilber, Don Weller, Stan Tracey and Mike Westbrook. Other bands he has toured and recorded with include the Gary Potter quartet, playing the music of Django Reinhardt, the Tina May Trio with Nikki Iles, Bill LeSage's Genetically Modified Quintet, and Spike Robinson's Tenor Madness. Barnes has also appeared as a session musician on albums by Selina Jones, Björk, Van Morrison, Bryan Ferry and can also be found on film and television soundtracks and jingles such as the Tetley Bitter series of adverts featuring his solo baritone.

== Awards ==
- Best Instrumentalist, BBC Jazz Awards, 2001, 2006
- Clarinet, British Jazz Awards, 2016
- In the Marston's Pedigree British Jazz Awards, Barnes won the alto and clarinet sections five times and the baritone section three times.

== Discography ==
=== As leader or sideman ===
- 1987: Affiliation (Miles)
- 1993: Side-Steppin (Big Bear)
- 1995: Thirsty Work (Fret)
- 1995: Here Comes Trouble (Fret)
- 1995: Let's Face The Music (Big Bear)
- 1998: Below Zero (Concord)
- 2000: Cannonball (Asc)
- 2000: The Pollwinners Playing Girl Talk (Zephyr)
- 2002: If You Could See Me Now (Zephyr)
- 2003: Better Late Than Never (Woodville)
- 2003: Swingin' the Samba (Woodville)
- 2003: The Sherlock Holmes Suite (Woodville)
- 1998: A Dotty Blues (Zephyr)
- 1999: Memories of You (Zephyr)
- 1999: Jumpin (Zephyr)
- 2004: The Marbella Jazz Suite (Big Bear)
- 2005: Yeah! (Specific Jazz)
- 2006: Blessing in Disguise (Woodville)
- 2011: Inside Out (Woodville)
- 2014: The Cobbler's Waltz (Woodville)
- 2014: Live at the Watermill (Woodville)
- 2015: One for Moll (Woodville)
- 2015: A Jazz Christmas Carol (Woodville)
- 2006: Zootcase (Woodville)
- 2015: Oh Gee (Woodville)

With Tony Coe

- 1998: Shine (Zephyr)
- 1998: Days of Wine and Roses (Zephyr)

With John Horler

- 2004: Stablemates (Woodville)

With Brian Lemon

- 1996: A Sleeping Bee (Zephyr)
- 1997: Young Minds–Old Hands (Zephyr)
- 1997: Play Jerome Kern: Yesterdays (Zephyr)

With David Newton

- 1993: Like Minds (Fret)
- 2000: Summertime (Concord)
- 2001: Manhattan feat. Conte Candoli (Concord)

With Alan Plater

- 2004: Songs for Unsung Heroes (Woodville)
- 2006: Seven Ages of Jazz (Woodville)

With Martin Taylor

- 2011: Two for the Road (Woodville)

=== As guest ===
- 1995: Post – Björk (One Little Indian)
- 1989: Avalon Sunset – Van Morrison (Polydor/Umgd)
- 1985: Straight Eight – Tommy Whittle (Miles Music)
- 1996: Off Beaten Track – Mick Talbot & Steve White (New Note)
- 1997: The Don Weller Big Band Live (33 Jazz)
- 1997: Revisited – Jim Richardson's Pogo (Spotlite)
- 1997: Lay 'em Straight! – Humphrey Lyttelton (Calligraph)
- 1998: Bootleg Eric – David Newton and Clark Tracey (Asc)
- 1999: As Time Goes By – Bryan Ferry (Virgin)
- 2000: John Williams' Baritone Band – John Williams' Baritone Band (Spotlite)
- 2003: Live and Swinging – Pete York Jazz All Stars (Nagel Heyer)
- 2004: Twentysomething – Jamie Cullum (Verve)
- 2007: Barnestorming – Alan Barnes/Harry Allen (Woodville)
- 2007: Nine Songs – Don Weller/Bobby Wellins (Trio)
- 2013: Ninick - Remi Harris (Big Bear)
- 2015: The Kofi/Barnes Aggregation with Tony Kofi (Woodville)
