= Bernardo Sassetti =

Portuguese jazz pianist and composer

- Born: 24 June 1970; Lisbon, Portugal
- Died: 10 May 2012 (aged 41) Guincho, Cascais, Portugal
- Genres: Jazz
- Occupations: Musician, film composer, music educator
- Instrument: Piano
- Years active: 1980s–2012
- Labels: Clean Feed
- Spouse: Beatriz Batarda (before 2012)

Bernardo da Costa Sassetti Pais (24 June 1970 – 10 May 2012) was a Portuguese jazz pianist and film composer.

== Life and career ==
Sassetti was born in Lisbon. He was a great-grandson of Sidónio Pais, President of the First Republic. He initially played guitar, then began studying piano and music theory at age nine. He became interested in jazz after hearing Bill Evans. By the late 1980s, he was backing visiting musicians and teaching jazz piano in Lisbon (and, later, taught throughout other lusophonic areas). During the 1990s, he worked in London, where he recorded three albums with Guy Barker's group. Anthony Minghella invited them to appear as the Napoli Jazz Sextet in The Talented Mr. Ripley.

His 2006 album Unreal: Sidewalk Cartoon received a four-star rating (of a possible four) in The Penguin Guide to Jazz (9th ed.), and was selected for The Penguin Jazz Guide: The History of the Music in the 1000 Best Albums.

In addition to his jazz work, Sassetti has composed numerous film scores.

== Death ==
Shortly before his death Sassetti was complaining of a spinal disc herniation and of tendinitis that was affecting his piano performance. He had lost weight and seemed discouraged. He died on 10 May 2012 after falling off a cliff in Abano Beach, near Guincho Beach, in Cascais, where he was allegedly shooting pictures for his next book but where no camera was ever found. The Public Prosecution Service's inquiry report stated that there were "no indications of suspected death attributable to third parties" and that "most likely, the death of Bernardo Sassetti occurred due to a fall attributable only to himself". Several places in the coast of Cascais are often connoted with suicide attempts and deaths. Abano Beach was the same place where in 2020 the actor Pedro Lima would die in a death that was ruled a suicide.

== Personal life ==
Bernardo Sassetti was married to actress Beatriz Batarda, with whom he had two daughters. Sidónio Pais, who served as the fourth president of the First Portuguese Republic in 1918, was his great grandfather.

== Discography ==
- Mundos (Universal Music Portugal, 1996)
- Olhar with Carlos Barretto, Mario Barreiros, Perico Sambeat (Beat Up, 1999)
- Specifics 45: Cuba Cuba with Guy Barker (Music House, 2000)
- Salsetti (West Wind, 2000)
- Nocturno (Clean Feed, 2002)
- Mario Laginha Bernardo Sassetti (ONC Produções Culturais, 2003)
- Indigo (Clean Feed, 2004)
- Ascent (Clean Feed, 2005)
- Alice (Trem Azul, 2005)
- Unreal: Sidewalk Cartoon (Clean Feed, 2006)
- 3 Pianos with Mario Laginha, Pedro Burmester (Sony, 2007)
- Dúvida (Trem Azul, 2007)
- Second Life (Original Soundtrack) (Utopia Música, 2009)
- Palace Ghosts and Drunken Hymns with Will Holshouser (Clean Feed, 2009)
- Um Amor De Perdição (Trem Azul, 2009)
- Carlos Do Carmo Bernardo Sassetti (Universal Music Portugal, 2010)

== Filmography ==
- Second Life (2009) composer
- Os Grandes Portugueses (2007) (TV) .... Himself
- Antes de Amanhã (2007) composer
- 98 Octanas (2006) composer
- Alice (2005) composer
- A Costa dos Murmúrios (2004) composer
- O Milagre segundo Salomé (2004) composer
- Maria E as Outras (2004) composer
- Quaresma (2003) composer
- Aniversário (2000) (TV) composer
- Facas e Anjos (2000) (TV) composer
- O Segredo (2000) composer
- As Terças da Bailarina Gorda (2000) composer
- Maria do Mar (1930) (2000) composer
- The Talented Mr. Ripley (1999) – pianist (Napoli Jazz Sextet)
- Mundo VIP (2 episodes, Show nº 12 and Show nº 197, 1996-2000) – Himself
