= Jonathan Gee =

British jazz musician

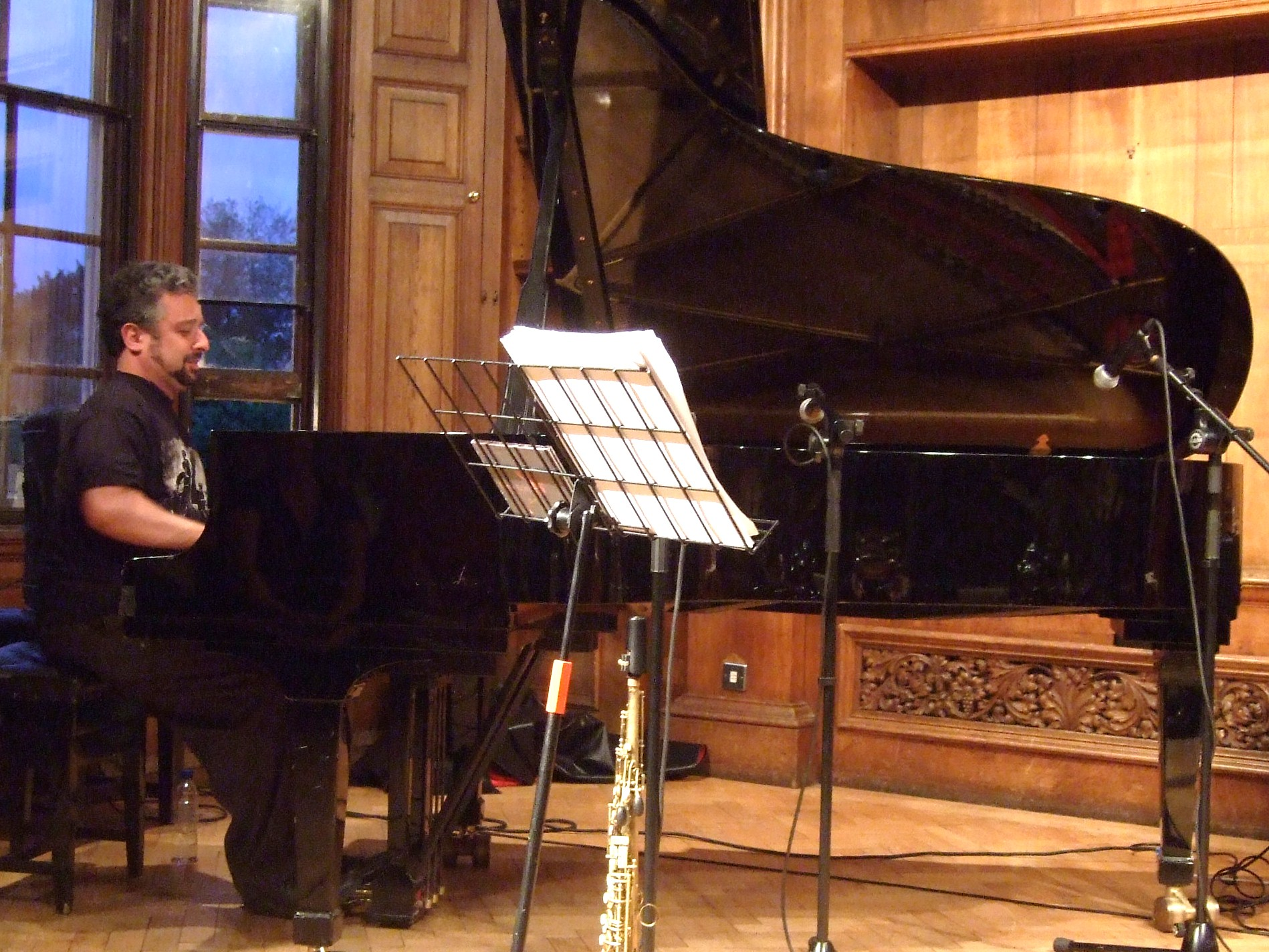
Jonathan Gee

Jonathan Gee is a British jazz pianist and composer, voted Guardian/Wire British Jazz Awards "Most Promising Newcomer" in 1991.

Jonathan has been the driving force behind a number of projects, from the Monk Liberation Front in the early 2000s, which performed the complete works of Thelonius Monk at the London Jazz Festival in 2007, to electric band and vocal projects, a quartet featuring covers of Beatles songs, and several different trio line-ups. In 2026 he will have released twelve albums, and appeared on dozens of others.

Gee was born in Jaffa, Israel, but his family soon relocated to London, England. He developed his interest in jazz whilst attending Sheffield University.
