= Mornington Lockett =

English jazz saxophonist

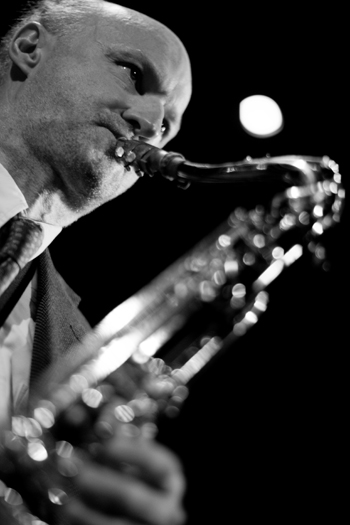
Lockett in 2009

Mornington Edward Lockett (born 19 November 1961) is an English jazz saxophonist.

== Career ==
Lockett began playing clarinet at the age of 14 while he was a student at Cowes High School, before switching to tenor saxophone. He studied at Dartington College of Arts, graduating in 1981, then undertook further study at the Guildhall School of Music and Drama in 1984–85, under the tutelage of Lionel Grigson. Lockett has played in the bands of Jim Mullen (1988–93), Ronnie Scott (1990–94), Arturo Sandoval (1993), Ian Shaw (1994), Andrea Vicari (1994), Martin Drew (1995–2010), Stan Tracey (1996–2010), Don Weller (2000), Sarah Jane Morris (1985–2009) and Jimmy Smith (2002–04), among others.

In February 1996, Lockett's album Late Night Sax: After Dark reached No. 18 in the UK Albums Chart.

From 2000 until 2004 Lockett was involved in a group called "Celebrating The Jazz Couriers", playing the music of Ronnie Scott and Tubby Hayes. The group was co-led by Martin Drew and won the British Jazz Award for "Best Small Group" in 2002. The band was reformed in 2004 as "The New Jazz Couriers".

In November 2008, in conjunction with fellow tenor saxophonists Art Themen and Don Weller, Lockett released the album The 3 Tenors at the Appleby Jazz Festival.

Lockett now works at St. Paul's Girls' School, and the Royal College of Music in London, teaching jazz saxophone and improvisation. He has also taught at Trinity College of Music, Leeds College of Music and has been a visiting tutor at the Dordogne Jazz Summer School. Lockett led a monthly residency at the 606 Club in Chelsea with Peter King (saxophonist) until a year before King's death and has since run an annual tribute - "Peter King Memorial Sax Summit" - with guest saxophonists such as Graeme Blevins, Simon Allen and Alex Clarke.
