= Bryan Spring =

British jazz drummer (born 1945)

Bryan Spring (born 24 August 1945) is a British jazz drummer. He is sometimes credited as Brian Spring.

He was born in London, England. Spring was self-taught, beginning at the age of six, though he later studied with Philly Joe Jones. He led and co-led his own trios and quartets from the mid-1970s to the early 1990s with Don Weller and also Art Themen. Later, into the 2000s, he collaborated with Mark Edwards and Andy Cleyndert. Spring has been a member of groups such as Bill Le Sage's Bebop Preservation Society, Alan Skidmore's Quartet, Klaus Doldinger's Passport, and various line-ups led by Stan Tracey.

He has also worked with other leading British jazz musicians, including Tubby Hayes, Dick Morrissey, Bobby Wellins, as well as accompanying American musicians, notably George Coleman and Charlie Rouse, when they were visiting the UK.

== Recordings ==
=== As leader/co-leader ===
- 1980: Commit No Nuisance - with Don Weller
- 2005: The Spirit of Spring - Bryan Spring Trio (Trio TR568)

=== As sideman ===
- 1969: Free An' One - Stan Tracey Quartet (Columbia SCX6385)
- 1969: Hum Dono - Amancio D'Silva Quartet (Columbia)
- 1969: Our Point Of View - Frank Ricotti (CBS 52668)
- 1969: The Seven Ages of Man - The Stan Tracey Big Band (Columbia SCX6413)
- 1970: Perspectives - Stan Tracey Quartet (Columbia SCX6485)
- 1970: BBC Top Gear - Keith Tippett Group (Unreleased)
- 1971: Dedicated to You But You Weren't Listening - The Keith Tippett Sextet (Vertigo 1/1971 LP)
- 1972: Second Passport - Klaus Doldinger - (Atlantic ATL 40417)
- 1974: Under The Sun - Nucleus (Vertigo 6360 110)
- 1975: Captain Adventure - Stan Tracey Quartet (SJ102)
- 1975: The Return Of Captain Adventure - Stan Tracey Quartet (TTTCDS753)
- 1976: Under Milk Wood - Stan Tracey and Donald Houston (RCA PL25073), (TAA271)
- 1976: Direct Hits - Nucleus (Vertigo 9286 019)
- 1976: The Bracknell Connection - Stan Tracey Octet (Steam SJ103)
- 1978: The Salisbury Suite - Stan Tracey Octet (Steam SJ105)
- 1981: Poem Song - Marvin Hannibal Peterson (Mole 6)
- 1996: Live at the Bull's Head, Barnes - Don Weller Big Band (33 Records)
- 2000: Triple Exposure - Mark Edwards (Hi-Hat HHR0002)
