= Don Weller (musician) =

English jazz musician (1940–2020)

- Born: Donald Arthur Albert Weller; 19 December 1940; Thornton Heath, Croydon, England
- Died: 30 May 2020 (aged 79) Croydon, Surrey, England
- Genres: Jazz, post bop, rock
- Occupations: Musician, composer
- Instruments: Tenor saxophone, clarinet

Donald Arthur Albert Weller (19 December 1940 – 30 May 2020) was an English jazz musician, tenor saxophonist, and composer.

== Career ==
Don Weller began learning clarinet at the age of 14, and was classically educated on it for four or five years, and played the solo part in Mozart's Clarinet Concerto at Croydon Town Hall aged 15. He began playing in Dixieland bands around the Croydon area, but later switched to tenor saxophone and played in Kathy Stobart's rehearsal band.

During the 1970s, his jazz-rock group Major Surgery played a regular weekly gig at a Croydon pub, the Dog & Bull. The band played Weller's compositions on the album released as "The First Cut". This was followed by a quartet with drummer Bryan Spring. At the same time, he worked regularly with pianist Stan Tracey, and also with Harry Beckett and in a quintet with Art Themen. Renowned for his versatility, he has played with artists such as Alan Price, Tina May and Charlie Hearnshaw.

Weller played saxophone on the 1973 album Allright on the Night by British hard rock band Tucky Buzzard. He appears as lead sax (with Tower of Power backing him on horns) on the instrumental track "Nascimento" of Cat Stevens' 1978 LP Back To Earth. He also played on the Alex Harvey album The Mafia Stole My Guitar released in 1979 delivering the solo on the track Wait For Me Mama and writing Don's Delight.

In 1981, he stood in for Michael Brecker when the Gil Evans Orchestra played at the Bracknell Jazz Festival, subsequently touring the UK and recording with one of the band's trumpeters, Hannibal Marvin Peterson, added on to the Weller–Spring Quartet. He also played and recorded with Evans' British Orchestra in 1983. Also in the 1980s, together with his friend and fellow tenor sax Dick Morrissey, Weller was a regular member of Rocket 88, the boogie-woogie fun band set up by Ian "Stu" Stewart and Bob Hall, appearing on the band's only album.

Weller was described as a "first choice for TV and film soundtracks". He played the saxophone solo on David Bowie's theme song for the film Absolute Beginners (1986). He also contributed to the jazz club movie Stormy Monday (1988). In 1995, he was commissioned by the Appleby Jazz Festival organiser Neil Ferber to write The "Pennine Suite" for a jazz big band which was premiered at the 1995 Appleby festival and released on CD the following year. Since then the band has regularly appeared at other jazz festivals. A later commission from Appleby Jazz was for his 'Electric Jazz Octet'.

== Personal life and death ==
Weller had a triple heart bypass operation in 2012, after which his enthusiasm for playing never fully returned. His account of "We'll Be Together Again" at fellow musician Bobby Wellins' funeral in late 2016 was, in saxophonist Art Themen’s words, "incredibly moving and eerily prescient". It has been said that Weller "made jazz richer, wittier and more warmly invigorating." He died in his home town of Croydon on 30 May 2020 aged 79. He was survived by his son, Mark, and daughter, Katie.

== Discography ==
=== As leader ===
- Commit No Nuisance (Affinity, 1979)
- Live (33 Records, 1997)
- Cannonball with Alan Barnes (ASC, 2000)
- The Way You're Going to Look Tomorrow Morning (Trio, 2003)
- Nine Songs (Trio, 2007)

=== As sideman ===
With Alan Price

- Alan Price (Jet, 1977)
- Alan Stuart Octet (BBC 1978)
- Lucky Day (Jet, 1979)
- Travellin' Man (Trojan, 1986)
- Liberty (Ariola, 1989)

With East of Eden

- Here We Go Again... (EMI, 1976)
- It's the Climate (Harvest, 1978)
- Silver Park (Harvest/EMI, 1978)

With Tina May

- Never Let Me Go (33 Records, 1992)
- Fun (33 Records, 1993)
- It Ain't Necessarily So (33 Records, 1994)
- Time Will Tell (33 Records, 1995)

With Stan Tracey

- The Bracknell Connection (Steam, 1976)
- Salisbury Suite (Steam, 1978)
- Stan Tracey Now (Steam, 1983)
- Play Duke, Monk & Bird (Emanem, 1988)
- Portraits Plus (Blue Note, 1992)
- Live at the QEH (Blue Note, 1994)

With others

- Harry Beckett, Still Happy (My Only Desire, 2016)
- David Bowie, Absolute Beginners (Virgin, 1986)
- Tucky Buzzard, Allright On the Night (Purple, 1973)
- Al Casey, Al Casey Remembers King Curtis (JSP, 1985)
- Hugh Cornwell, Wolf (Virgin, 1988)
- King Curtis, Live In New York (JSP, 2008)
- Gil Evans, The British Orchestra (Mole, 1983)
- The Firm, The Firm (Atlantic, 1985)
- Flowered Up, Weekender (Heavenly/Columbia, 1992)
- Michael Garrick, You've Changed (Hep, 1981)
- Alex Harvey, The New Band the Mafia Stole My Guitar (RCA Victor, 1979)
- Dick Heckstall-Smith, Celtic Steppes (33 Records, 1995)
- Mike Heron, Mike Heron (Casablanca, 1979)
- Nicky James, Nicky James (Philips, 1971)
- Hannibal Lokumbe, Poem Song (Mole, 1981)
- Meal Ticket, Three Times a Day (Logo/EMI, 1977)
- Mick Pyne, A Little Blue (Miles Music, 1988)
- Jim Richardson, 2 Plus 2 (Actone, 2010)
- Rocket 88, Rocket 88 (Atlantic, 1981)
- Cat Stevens, Back to Earth (A&M, 1978)
- Charlie Watts, Live at Fulham Town Hall (CBS, 1986)
