= Mons Records =

German independent record label

- Founded: 1991
- Founder: Thilo Berg
- Genre: Jazz, classical
- Country of origin: Germany
- Location: Trippstadt
- Official website: Official site

Mons Records is a German independent record label for jazz and classical music founded in 1991 by Thilo Berg in Trippstadt. The label has released music by among others Clark Terry, Jeff Hamilton, Bobby Shew, Tom Harrell, Ray Brown, Benny Green, Dado Moroni, Larry Fuller, Nancy King, Allan Harris, Carl Allen, Richard Bona, Manu Katché, Quentin Dujardin, Ivan Paduart, Barbara Morrison, Nicholas Payton, Bob Mintzer, Ben Wolfe, Greg Hutchinson, Dewey Redman, Ethan Iverson, Ralph Moore, Robert Hurst, Dee Daniels, Jiggs Whigham, Don Braden, Joris Teepe, the Metropole Orkest, Christian Bruckner, Scott Colley, Wolfgang Haffner, Kevin Hays, Eric Marienthal, Benyamin Nuss, Clarence Penn, Steffen Schorn, Stan Sulzmann, George Whitty, and Young Voices Brandenburg.
