= Guy Barker =

English jazz trumpeter and composer (born 1957)

Guy Barker MBE
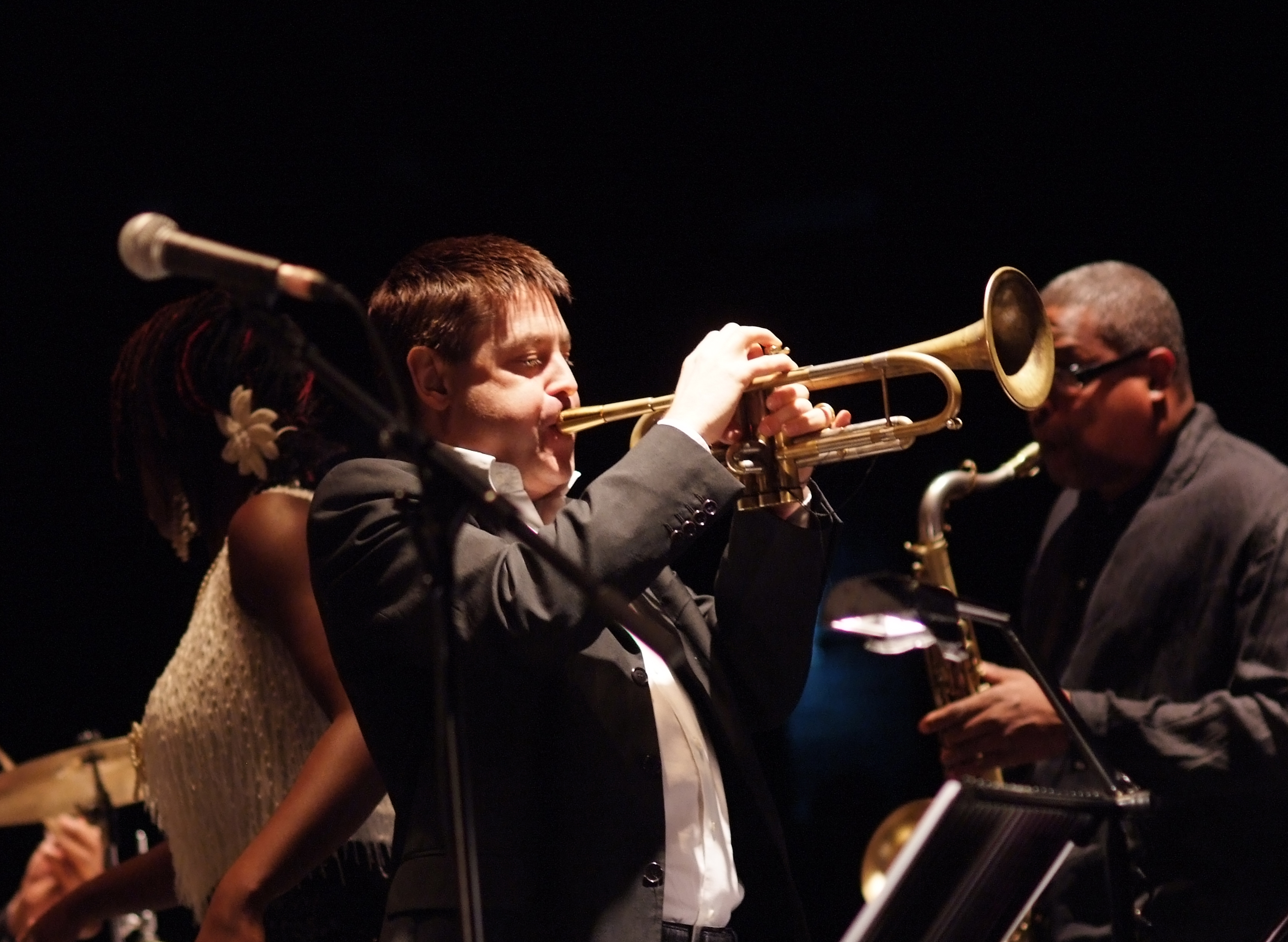
- Guy Barker and Jean Toussaint in 2007

Background information
- Born: Guy Jeffrey Barker; 26 December 1957 (age 68); Chiswick, London, England
- Genres: Jazz; jazz fusion; pop; rock
- Occupations: Musician; composer; bandleader
- Instrument: Trumpet
- Years active: 1975–present

Guy Jeffrey Barker, MBE (born 26 December 1957) is an English jazz trumpeter and composer.

== Early life ==
Barker was born in Chiswick, London, the son of an actress and a stuntman. He started playing the trumpet at the age of twelve, and within a year had joined the National Youth Jazz Orchestra. At the age of 15 he was playing with the Crouch End Allstars along with Wally Fawkes and Bob Nadkarni.

== Later life and career ==
After lessons from Clark Terry in 1975, Barker went on in the 1980s to play with John Dankworth, Gil Evans (with whose orchestra he toured and recorded in 1983), Lena Horne, and Bobby Watson.

Barker was a member of Clark Tracey's quintet from 1984 to 1992. As a sideman he has played with Ornette Coleman, Carla Bley, Georgie Fame, James Carter, Mike Westbrook, Frank Sinatra, Colin Towns, Natalie Merchant, ABC, The The, Haircut One Hundred, Erasure, Chris Botti, Wham!, Kajagoogoo, The Housemartins, Matt Bianco, Alphaville, The Style Council, Swing Out Sister, The Moody Blues, Sting, Bucks Fizz, Mike Oldfield, Cleo Laine, Acoustic Alchemy, XTC, and Stan Tracey.

Previously, his own band has featured an international mix of musicians – Perico Sambeat (alto saxophone; Spain), Bernardo Sassetti (piano; Portugal), Geoff Gascoyne (bass, United Kingdom), and Gene Calderazzo (drums; United States).

More recently, he has toured with the Guy Barker Jazz Orchestra – a 15-piece big band featuring Rosario Giuliani (alto saxophone; Italy) and Per Johansson (tenor saxophone; Sweden) – performing DZF, a reworking of Mozart's Magic Flute with Michael Brandon narrating the story as a Raymond Chandler-style novel, retold by Robert Ryan.

Barker was music director and arranger for the opening gala concert "Jazz Voice: Celebrating a Century of Song" at the London Jazz Festival annually from 2008 to 2014. He was also music director and arranger on a number of BBC Radio 2 Friday Night Is Music Night shows featuring the Guy Barker Jazz Orchestra with the BBC Concert Orchestra, celebrating the music of Billie Holiday, / Duke Ellington and Billy Strayhorn Ella Fitzgerald, Aretha Franklin and Dusty Springfield, / Jazz Royalty to celebrate the Wedding of Prince William and Catherine Middleton.

Barker was appointed Member of the Order of the British Empire (MBE) in the 2015 New Year Honours for services to jazz. He was awarded the BASCA Gold Badge in 2013. He also recorded with Gordon Haskell a new version of the latter's hit single, "How Wonderful You Are". A samba version of the track is on The Cat Whose Got The Cream album (2020).

== Discography ==
- Isn't It? (1991)
- Into the Blue (1995)
- Timeswing (1996)
- What Love Is (1998)
- Soundtrack (2001)
- The Amadeus Project (2007)

With Mike Westbrook

- The Cortège (Original Records, 1982)

== See also ==
- List of jazz arrangers
