= Tucky Buzzard =

British hard rock band

- Origin: England
- Genres: Hard rock; blues rock
- Years active: 1969–1974
- Label: producer: Bill Wyman
- Past members: Jimmy Henderson (vocals); Terry Taylor (guitar); David Brown (bass); Chris Johnson (drums); Nicky Graham (keyboards); Paul Francis (drums); Paul Kendrick (guitar, vocals); Phil Talbot (guitar)

Tucky Buzzard were a British hard rock band formed in 1969 by three former members of The End. The original lineup was Jimmy Henderson (vocals), Terry Taylor (guitar), David Brown (bass), Paul Francis (drums), and Nick Graham (keyboards). Halfway through recording their second album, Francis departed from the band and was replaced by Chris Johnson, who recorded the remaining drum parts and was credited on the album sleeve. Tucky Buzzard produced a total of five albums between 1969 and 1973. The band's producer was Bill Wyman of the Rolling Stones.

Terry Taylor has worked on a number of musical compositions with Bill Wyman and has played with him in a number of his bands, Willy and The Poor Boys, Bill Wyman's Rhythm Kings, since he left The Rolling Stones. In 2006 Tucky Buzzard was featured in an article called Top 6 Classic Rock Bands You Never Knew You Didn't Know written by Dave White.

== Albums ==
=== Studio albums ===
- Coming on Again (Spain: Hispavox HHS 11-208, 1971)
- Tucky Buzzard (US: Capitol ST 787, 1971)
- Warm Slash (Capitol E-ST 864, 1971)
- Allright on the Night (Purple Records TPSA 7510, 1973)
- Buzzard (Purple Records TPSA 7512, 1973)

=== Compilations ===
- Time Will Be Your Doctor: Rare Recordings 1971–1972 (Castle/Sanctuary CMEDD1249, 2005)

This was an album compiling the band's first three studio albums.
