= Dave Green (musician) =

English jazz bassist (born 1942)

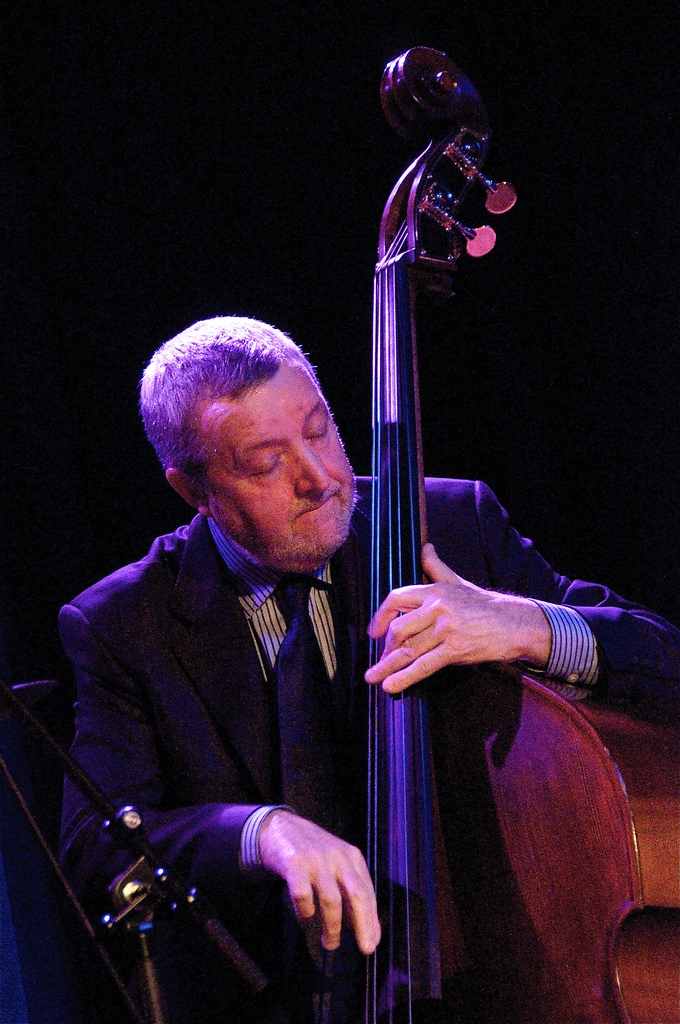
- Green during a concert of The ABC&D of Boogie Woogie in Herisau, Switzerland on 13 January 2010

Background information
- Born: David John Green; 5 March 1942 (age 84); Edgware, London, England, UK
- Genres: Jazz
- Occupation: Musician
- Instrument: Double bass
- Years active: 1960s–present

David John Green (born 5 March 1942) is an English jazz bassist.

== Background ==
Green's first public performances were with his childhood friend Charlie Watts in the late 1950s. While performing with Humphrey Lyttelton from 1963 to 1983, Green also played with the Don Rendell–Ian Carr band in the early 1960s, and went on to play with Stan Tracey. In the early 1980s, Green led his own group, Fingers, featuring Lol Coxhill, Bruce Turner and Michael Garrick. Green regularly backed visiting American stars at Ronnie Scott's Jazz Club, including Coleman Hawkins, Ben Webster, Roland Kirk and Sonny Rollins. Green has also performed and recorded with Dave Newton, Didier Lockwood and Spike Robinson.

In 1991, Green was a founding member of Charlie Watts's quintet, together with Gerard Presencer, Peter King and Brian Lemon.

Since 1998, Green has led a trio featuring Iain Dixon and Gene Calderazzo, and since 2009, he has been a member of The ABC&D of Boogie Woogie, with Ben Waters, Axel Zwingenberger and Charlie Watts, performing at the Lincoln Center with Bob Seeley and Lila Ammons.

== Discography ==
=== As leader/co-leader ===
- 1979: Fingers Remembers Mingus – Fingers
- 2001: Time Will Tell
- 2011: Turn Left at Monday
- 2012: The ABC&D of Boogie Woogie – live in Paris
- 2022: Raise Four (Trio Records, recorded 2004)

=== As sideman ===
- 1964: Moonscape – Michael Garrick Trio
- 1966: John Handy's Quintet – Captain John Handy
- 1970: Webster's Dictionary – Ben Webster
- 1974: Swinging Scorpio – Buddy Tate
- 1977: Diverse – Lol Coxhill
- 1980: Primrose Path - Jimmy Knepper
- 1983: East 34th Street – Peter King
- 1984: London Reprise – Spike Robinson
- 1987: Playing in the Yard – Stan Tracey
- 1992: And Heaven Too – Ken Peplowski
- 1992: At Sundown – Acker Bilk and Humphrey Lyttelton
- 1992: Portraits Plus – Stan Tracey
- 1993: Some Other Spring – Tony Coe
- 1993: Some Other Autumn – Tony Coe
- 1993: East of the Sun – Scott Hamilton
- 1995: A Man and His Music – Bob Wilber
- 1995: How Long Has This Been Going On? – Roy Williams
- 1995: The Hamburg Concert – Bob Wilber
- 1995: But Beautiful – Brian Lemon
- 1996: Braff Plays Wimbledon – Ruby Braff
- 1996: First Moves – John Critchinson
- 1997: Days of Wine and Roses – Tony Coe
- 1997: Dave Cliff and Friends – When Lights Are Low – Dave Cliff
- 1998: With Every Breath – Joe Temperley
- 2002: A Special Alliance – John Bunch
- 2011: The Girl with Brown Hair – Dick Morrissey and the Michael Garrick Trio
