= Stan Tracey =

British jazz pianist and composer (1926–2013)

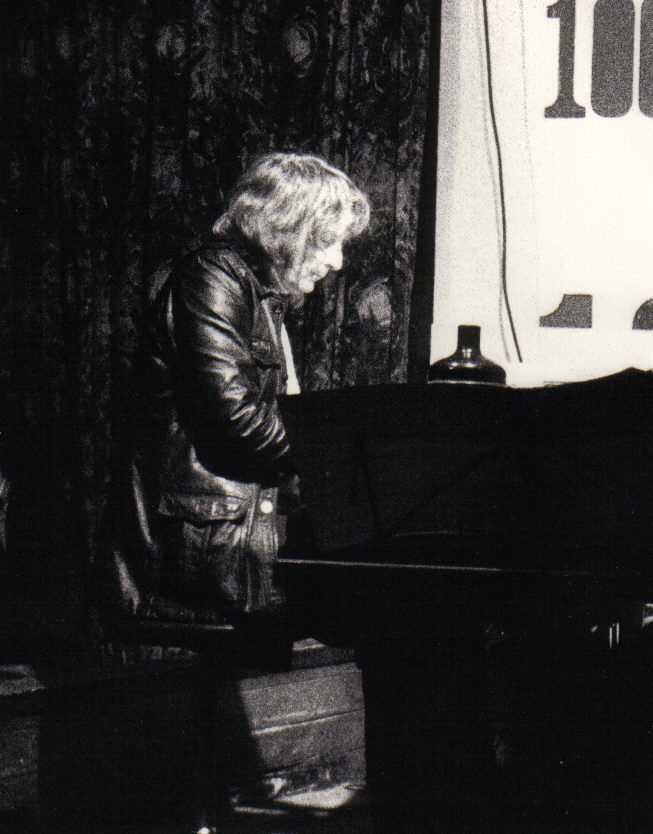
- Tracey playing in the 100 Club in the 1980s

Background information
- Born: Stanley William Tracey; 30 December 1926; Denmark Hill, South London, England
- Died: 6 December 2013 (aged 86)
- Genres: Jazz
- Occupations: Musician, composer
- Instrument: Piano
- Labels: Decca; Columbia (UK); Steam/ReSteamed Records
- Website: stantracey.com

Stanley William Tracey (30 December 1926 – 6 December 2013) was a British jazz pianist and composer, whose most important influences were Duke Ellington and Thelonious Monk. Tracey's best known recording is the 1965 album Jazz Suite Inspired by Dylan Thomas's "Under Milk Wood", which is based on the BBC radio drama Under Milk Wood by Dylan Thomas.

== Early career ==
The Second World War meant that Tracey had a disrupted formal education, and he became a professional musician at the age of sixteen as a member of an ENSA touring group playing the accordion, his first instrument. He joined Ralph Reader's Gang Shows at the age of nineteen, while in the RAF and formed a brief acquaintance with the comedian Tony Hancock. Later, in the early 1950s, he worked in groups on the transatlantic liners Queen Mary and Caronia and toured the UK in 1951 with Cab Calloway. By the mid-1950s, he had also taken up the vibraphone, but later ceased playing it. At this time he worked widely with leading British modernists, including drummer Tony Crombie, clarinettist Vic Ash, the saxophonist-arranger Kenny Graham and trumpeter Dizzy Reece.

In February 1957, he toured the United States with Ronnie Scott's group, and became the pianist with Ted Heath's Orchestra in September for two years (1958–59), including a US tour with singer Carmen McRae. Although Tracey disliked Heath's music, he gained a regular income and was well featured as a soloist on both piano and vibes, and contributed compositions and arrangements that stayed in the Heath book for many years. The following year he recorded his first album as leader, Showcase, for English Decca (also Heath's label) and Little Klunk in 1959; he had first recorded in 1952 with the trumpeter Kenny Baker. At Decca Records, Tracey met his future wife, Jackie Buckland (3 April 1929 – 13 August 2009); the couple had two children Clark and Sarah.

== At Ronnie's and the Under Milk Wood LP ==
From March 1960 until about 1967 (some sources give 1968), Tracey was the house pianist at Ronnie Scott's Jazz Club in Soho, London, and he had the opportunity to accompany many of the leading musicians from the US who visited the club. Recordings of some of these performances appeared on LP, while others appeared on the Jazz House and Harkit labels, recorded by the journalist Les Tomkins, but with non-professional recording equipment. While working at Scott's club, Tracey gained some high-profile admirers; Sonny Rollins asserted at one concert: "Does anyone here know how good he is?". It is Tracey on piano that film viewers hear behind Rollins on the soundtrack of the Michael Caine version of Alfie (1966).

However, the experience of working in Scott's club affected Tracey's health; the long hours led to him taking various illicit stimulants, and the low wages also meant that he had to take the workman's bus back home to Streatham at 3 am.

At the same time, he became active too in Michael Horovitz's New Departures project, mixing poetry performances with jazz, where the musicians interacted spontaneously with the words. The New Departures group recorded an album in 1964 with saxophonist Bobby Wellins, a partnership that continued for several decades. Both men contributed original compositions to the album.

Tracey's 1965 album (its full title is Jazz Suite Inspired by Dylan Thomas's "Under Milk Wood") is one of the most celebrated jazz recordings made in the United Kingdom. Tracey was inspired to compose the suite by hearing the original 1953 BBC broadcast on an LP his wife Jackie had acquired. The track "Starless and Bible Black", a quote from the opening monologue, is probably the best demonstration of Wellins' lyricism and the highlight of Tracey's whole career. Such is the affection with which these pieces are held that Tracey has re-recorded them on several occasions, something that is unusual for British jazz musicians to do. Under Milk Wood was followed by Alice in Jazzland, an album for big band, the next year featuring many of his former Ted Heath colleagues. Later in the decade, Tracey made the arrangements for an Acker Bilk record, Blue Acker, and his first album dedicated to Duke Ellington compositions (both recorded in 1968), in this case to commemorate Ellington's 70th birthday the following year.

== Experimentation and consolidation ==
The early 1970s were a bleak time for Tracey. Around 1970, he almost chose to retrain as a postman under pressure from the Unemployment Benefits' office – "I would have quite a good pension by now" he quips – but his wife, formerly involved in public relations, took a more direct role in the development of Tracey's career.

He began to work with musicians of a later generation, who worked in a free or avant-garde style, including Mike Osborne, Keith Tippett and John Surman. Tracey continued to work in this idiom with Evan Parker at the UK's Appleby Jazz Festival for several years, but this was always more of a sideline for Tracey, who said that he "took more out of free music into the mainstream than I did from mainstream into free". Neil Ferber founder and organiser of the Appleby Jazz Festival built the festival around Stan Tracey and the musicians who worked with him, booking Stan to appear at every festival for the 18 years that it existed.

In the mid-1970s he formed his own record label, Steam, and through it reissued Under Milk Wood (the major label that held the rights to it had allowed it to fall out of print). Over the next decade he also used the outlet to issue recordings of a number of commissioned suites. These included The Salisbury Suite (1978), The Crompton Suite (1981) and The Poets Suite (1984).

He led his own octet from 1976 to 1985 and formed a sextet in 1979 (later called Hexad), touring widely in the Middle East and India. In this context he had a longstanding performance partnership from 1978 with saxophonist (and physician) Art Themen, and his own son, the drummer Clark Tracey. He was able to share the billing with arranger Gil Evans in a 1978 concert at the Royal Festival Hall, such was Tracey's pre-eminence in the UK. In private, he played Ellington recordings for Evans that the latter had not previously heard. Tracey continued to record with American musicians on occasion as well, with dates taking place with Sal Nistico in 1985 and Monk associate, Charlie Rouse in 1987.

The Steam label ceased trading in the early 1990s, reportedly because of difficulties caused by the retail trade's need for its inventory to carry a barcode. However, in 1992 Tracey benefited from Blue Note's brief interest in UK musicians, leading to the Portraits Plus album and the commercial issue of the BBC's recording of the concert commemorating the 50th anniversary of Tracey's first professional gig, as well as Under Milk Wood′s debut on CD.

In 1995 his new quartet featuring Gerard Presencer recorded the For Heaven's Sake album and also performed gigs together. In 2003 Tracey was the subject of a BBC Television documentary Godfather of British Jazz, a rare accolade nowadays for any jazz musician, let alone one from Britain. Tracey's catalogue from the LP era is being reissued on ReSteamed Records.

Already an Officer of the Order of the British Empire (OBE), he was appointed Commander of the Order of the British Empire (CBE) in the 2008 New Year Honours.

Tracey died of cancer on 6 December 2013; he was survived by his son, Clark Tracey, who has written a biography of his father, with a complete discography. His daughter Sarah died in 2012.

== Discography ==
=== As leader/co-leader ===
- Showcase (Vogue, 1958)
- Little Klunk (Vogue, 1959)
- The New Departures Quartet, The New Departures Quartet (Transalantic, 1964)
- Jazz Suite Inspired by Dylan Thomas's "Under Milk Wood" (Columbia, 1965) – soundtrack
- Laughin' & Scratchin' (Jazz House, 1966)
- Alice in Jazz Land (Columbia, 1966)
- Die Jazz Werkstatt '66 (NDR, 1966) – 1 track, Tracey session with Kenny Wheeler and Bobby Wellins otherwise unissued
- In Person (Columbia (EMI), 1966)
- With Love from Jazz (Columbia (EMI), 1967)
- We Love You Madly (Columbia (EMI), 1968)
- The Latin American Caper (Columbia (EMI), 1969)
- The Seven Ages of Man (Columbia (EMI), 1969)
- Free an' One (Columbia (EMI), 1970) – retitled Wisdom In The Wings, Resteamed, 2021)
- Perspectives (Columbia (EMI), 1970)
- Alone at Wigmore Hall (Cadillac, 1974)
- Captain Adventure (Steam, 1976) – live rec. 1975
- Under Milk Wood (RCA, 1976)
- The Bracknell Connection (Steam, 1976)
- Hello Old Adversary! (Steam, 1979)
- South East Assignment (Steam, 1980)
- The Crompton Suite (Steam, 1981)
- The Poets' Suite (Steam, 1984)
- Now (Steam, 1985)
- Live at Ronnie Scott's Hexad (Steam, 1985; Linn)
- Stan Tracey Plays Duke Ellington (Mole, 1986; TAA, 2001)
- Genesis and More (Steam, 1987)
- We Still Love You Madly (Mole, 1988; TAA, 2001)
- Portraits Plus (Blue Note, 1992)
- Live at the QEH (Blue Note, 1993)
- For Heaven's Sake (Cadillac, 1995)
- Solo: Trio (Cadillac, 1997)
- Comme D'Habitude (Jazzizit, 1998)
- The Durham Connection (33 Jazz, 1998)
- Stan Tracey Quartet with Phillip Madoc (2001)
- Live at the Savage Club (SAVAjazz, 2001)
- Zach's Dream (Trio, 2002)
- Seventy Something (Trio, 2003)
- The Last Time I Saw You with Peter King (Trio, 2004)
- Just You, Just Me with Danny Moss (Avid, 2003)
- Suspensions & Anticipations with Evan Parker (psi, 2003)
- Live at the Appleby Jazz Festival (Trio, 2004)
- For All We Know (Trio, 2005)
- Crevulations with Evan Parker (psi, 2005)
- Khumbula (Remember) with Louis Moholo-Moholo (Ogun, 2005)
- Let Them Crevulate with Guy Barker (Trio, 2005)
- Play Monk with Bobby Wellins (Resteamed, 2007) – rec. 2006
- The London Session (Dox, 2006)
- Senior Moment (Resteamed, 2008)
- The Later Works (Resteamed, 2009)
- Sound Check (Resteamed, 2010)
- A Child's Christmas (Resteamed, 2011)
- The Flying Pig (Resteamed, 2012)
- UK Live 1967 Vol. 1 (Jazzhus Disk, 2012) – rec. 1967 at the Manchester Sports Guild, with Ben Webster
- UK Live 1967 Vol. 2 (Jazzhus Disk, 2012) – rec. 1967 at the Manchester Sports Guild, with Ben Webster and Ronnie Scott
- The 1959 Sessions (ReSteamed, 2022) – rec. 1959

== As sideman ==
With Stan Getz

- Live In London (Harkit, 1964)
- Live In London Volume 2 (Harkit, 2004) – rec. 1964

With Ronnie Scott

- The Night Has A Thousand Eyes (Ronnie Scott's Jazz House, 1964) – also with Sonny Stitt
- The Night Is Scott and You're So Swingable (Fontana, 1966)
- When I Want Your Opinion, I'll Give It To You (Ronnie Scott's Jazz House, 1997) – rec. 1963–65

With Ben Webster

- Ben Webster At Ronnie Scott's 1964 (Storyville, 1964)
- Soho Nights Volume 1 (ReSteamed, 1968)
- Soho Nights With Stan Tracey - Vol. 2 (ReSteamed, 1964)
- Webster's Dictionary (Pye/Philips, 1970)

With others

- Guy Barker, Isn't It (Spotlite, 1991)
- Acker Bilk, Blue Acker (Columbia (EMI), 1968)
- The Mike McKenzie Group, ' Queen High ', Queenie Watts (Columbia SX6047), (1964) (from film ' Portrait of Queenie ', released by BFI)
- Don Byas, Autumn Leaves (Ronnie Scott's Jazz House, 1965)
- Al Cohn and Zoot Sims, Al And Zoot In London (World Record Club, 1965) – reissued on Harkit
- Georgie Fame and the Harry South Big Band, Sound Venture (Columbia, 1966)
- Benny Golson, Three Little Words (Ronnie Scott's Jazz House, 1965)
- Johnny Griffin, Live In London (Harkit, 1963)
- Paul Gonsalves and Tubby Hayes, Just Friends (Columbia (EMI), 1965)
- Joe Harriott, Personal Portrait (Columbia (EMI), 1967) – three tracks only
- J. J. Johnson, Live in London (Harkit, 2003) – rec. 1964
- Laurie Johnson, Synthesis (Columbia (E), 1969; Redial, 1998)
- Rahsaan Roland Kirk, Live In London (Harkit, 2004) – rec. 1964
- Prince Lasha, Insight (CBS, 1966)
- Yusef Lateef, Live in London (Harkit, 2004) – rec. 1964
- Harry Miller's Isipingo, Full Steam Ahead (Reel Recordings, 2009) – rec. 1975–77
- Wes Montgomery, Body And Soul (Ronnie Scott's Jazz House, 1965)
- Sal Nistico, Live In London (Steam, 1985)
- Mike Osborne, Tandem (Ogun, 1976)
- Sonny Rollins, Live In London (3 volumes) (Harkit, 1965)
- Charlie Rouse, Playin' In The Yard (Steam, 1987)
- Zoot Sims, Solo for Zoot (Fontana, 1962) – rec. 1961
- Alan Skidmore, East To West (Miles Music, 1989)
- Danny Thompson, Elemental (Antilles, 1990)
- Jimmy Witherspoon, Live in London (Harkit, 2003) – live rec. 1966

== Film soundtracks ==
- Stolen Hours (US: Summer Flight) (1963) – with Tubby Hayes a.o.
- Alfie (1966) – with Sonny Rollins
- Portrait of Queenie Queenie Watts (1964) - released by BFI - with the Mike McKenzie Group (the songs from, with others, released on ' Queen High ', (Columbia SX6047), (1966)
