= Anna Calvi discography =

The discography of English singer, songwriter, and musician Anna Calvi includes three studio albums, two extended plays, and eleven singles.

== Studio albums ==
List of studio albums, with selected chart positions and certifications
Title	Details	Peak chart positions										Sales
Title	Details	UK	AUT	BEL (FLA)	BEL (WAL)	FRA	GER	IRL	SWE	SWI	US Heat	Sales
Anna Calvi	Released: 17 January 2011; Label: Domino; Formats: CD, LP, digital download	40	33	9	36	17	70	72	55	40	42	FRA: 35,000
One Breath	Released: 7 October 2013; Label: Domino; Formats: CD, LP, digital download	32	69	20	40	33	79	31	—	56	30	UK: 14,111
Hunter	Released: 31 August 2018; Label: Domino; Formats: CD, LP, digital download	22	32	35	71	59	42	—	—	50	—	UK: 9,823

== EPs ==
List of EPs, showing details
Title	Details	Notes
Strange Weather	Released: 15 July 2014	Non-album tracks
Live for Burberry	Released: 20 February 2017	Live tracks
Tommy	Released: 6 May 2022	Accompanies Peaky Blinders' sixth season
Is This All There Is?	Released: 20 March 2026	

== Singles ==
List of singles, showing year released and album name
Year	Single	Album
2010	"Jezebel" / "Moulinette": Released: 11 October	Non-album singles
2011	"Blackout" / "Surrender": Released: 21 March	Anna Calvi
2011	"Desire" / "Joan of Arc": Released: 20 June	Anna Calvi
2011	"Suzanne and I" / "Baby It's You": Released: 12 September	Anna Calvi
2012	"Jezebel (Version Française)" / "Wolf Like Me": Released: 20 February	Non-album singles
2013	"Eliza" / "A Kiss to Your Twin": Released: 1 October	One Breath
2013	"Endless World" / "1970s Wind": Released: 7 October	Bonus 7" vinyl with Special Edition LP of One Breath
2013	"Suddenly" / "Fire": Released: 23 December	One Breath
2014	"Piece by Piece": Released: 31 March	One Breath
2014	"Strange Weather" (with David Byrne): Released: 26 July; (FR #123)	Strange Weather EP
2018	"Don't Beat the Girl Out of My Boy": Released: 6 July	Hunter

== Recording features ==
Year	Artist	Track title	Album	Contribution
2009	Johnny Flynn	"The Prizefighter and the Heiress"	Been Listening	Guitar
2013	Noah And The Whale	"Heart of Nowhere"	Heart of Nowhere	Vocals
2014	Marianne Faithfull	"Falling Back"	Give My Love to London	Backing Vocals
2016	Jherek Bischoff and Amanda Palmer	"Blackstar"	Strung Out In Heaven: A Bowie String Quartet Tribute	Vocals and Guitar
2016	The Invisible	"Love Me Again"	Patience	Vocals

== Film syncs ==
Year	Track Title	Film
2015	"The Heart of You"	Insurgent
