= James Mainwaring =

- Born: 1989 (age 36–37); Warrington, England
- Genres: Jazz, Contemporary
- Occupations: Bandleader, composer
- Instrument: Saxophone
- Website: http://www.jamesmainwaringmusic.com

James Mainwaring is an English jazz composer, saxophonist and bandleader.

== Childhood and education ==
Mainwaring was born in 1989 in Warrington where he grew up singing in rock bands and joined the Wigan Youth Jazz Orchestra. In 2007 he moved to Leeds to study jazz at Leeds College of Music and completed an MA in composition from the University of York.

== Career ==
In 2011 Mainwaring co-found Roller Trio who have released two albums, won the Peter Whittingham Jazz Award 2011 and in 2012 were chosen for BBC introducing, nominated for the Mercury Prize, MOBO best jazz act and best newcomer at the Jazz FM awards.

Mainwaring is a session musician for Django Django as well as touring with them he appears on their single "Reflections" from their second album Born Under Saturn. Mainwaring also performs solo on saxophone with electronics which was showcased at the EFG London Jazz Festival, 2014 which was described as an 'intense, uncompromising performance that was utterly compelling".

In 2015, he released the album The Earthworm's Eye View with his project Tipping Point, which was described by John Fordham in The Guardian as "Playful, dark, skilful and spontaneous… a surefooted trip across many persuasions in contemporary music."

== Discography ==
- Live at Seven Arts (with Mainwaring/Bardon/Horne) (2010)
- Roller Trio (with Roller Trio) (2011)
- Space Fight (with Space Fight) (2011)
- Live at Jazz in the Round (with Roller Trio) (2012)
- Live in Rotterdam (with Roller Trio) (2014)
- Fracture (with Roller Trio) (2014)
- The Earthworm's Eye View (Tipping Point) (2015)
- New Devices (with Roller Trio) (2018)
- Mycorrhiza (album) (James Mainwaring) (2021)
