= Mark Holub =

American drummer and composer (born 1981)

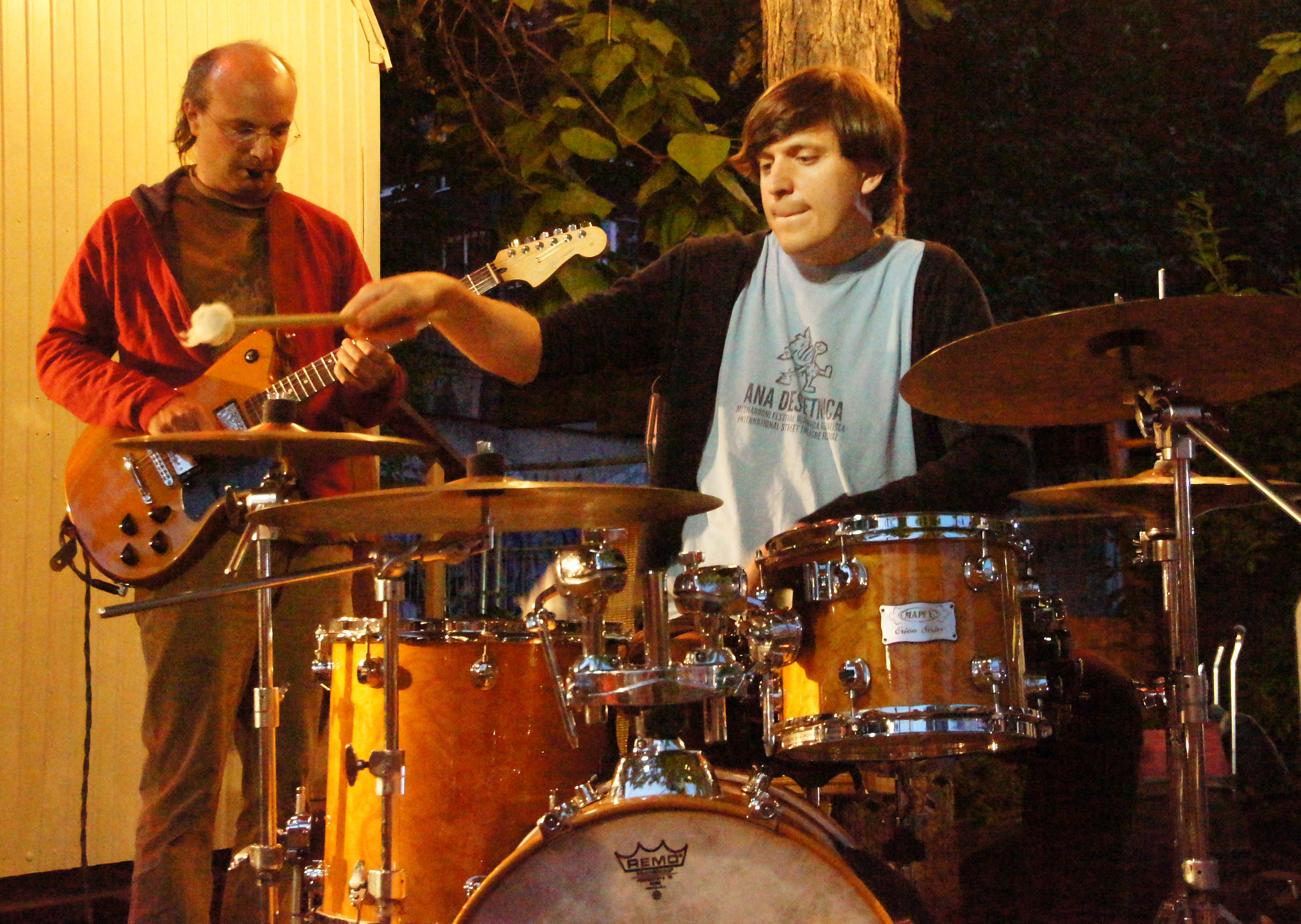
- Mark Holub with Blueblut

Background information
- Born: February 24, 1981 (age 45); New Jersey, United States
- Instruments: Drums
- Member of: Led Bib, Blueblut, Webster/Holub

Mark Holub is an American drummer and composer who was born in New Jersey, lived for many years in London, UK and is now based in Vienna, Austria. He is most well known as the bandleader for Led Bib, award-winning and Mercury Prize nominated jazz/rock quintet. He also plays regularly with other bands including Blueblut, a trio with Pamelia Kurstin - theremin and Chris Janka - guitar, who were recently on the Preis der Deutschen Schallplatten Kritik Bestenliste 'The Quartet' with Wang Chung front man Jack Hues, and he plays free improv with various collections of players including a long-standing duo with sax player Colin Webster., a trio with Viola Falb and Bernd Satzinger and a duo with violinist Irene Kepl

He has released a number of records with Led Bib on Cuneiform Records, including Sensible Shoes, Bring Your Own, The People in Your Neighbourhood and The Good Egg.,. Led Bib also released a number of recordings on RareNoiseRecords, Babel Label and Slam Productions.

In June 2015, Holub collaborated with modular synthesist James Holden and guitarist Marcus Hamblett. The project was recorded at Maida Vale Studios for BBC Radio 3's Late Junction.

More recent work sees Holub leading a new ensemble, called Anthropods, featuring Susanna Gartmayer - bass clarinet, Irene Kepl - violin, Clemens Sainitzer - cello and Jakob Gnigler - tenor sax. who released their debut album on Discus Music
