= Soor =

Soor may refer to:

- Sur, Iran, a village
- Soor State, a princely state of India merged with Idar State in 1821
- Battle of Soor (1745), in Bohemia
- Régina Airport (ICAO:SOOR), in French Guiana
- Tyre, Lebanon
- Pritpal Soor, London-based music producer and writer

== See also ==
- Sur (disambiguation)
