= Fiona Brice =

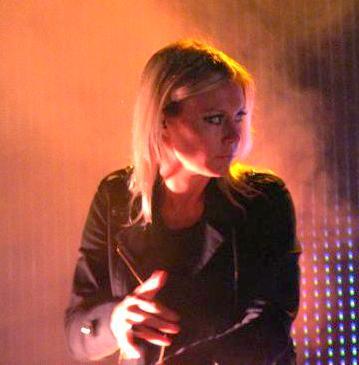
- Brice performing with Placebo in 2010

Background information
- Origin: Northampton, England
- Genres: Contemporary classical; alternative rock; pop
- Instruments: Violin; keyboards; theremin

Fiona Brice is an English composer, orchestral arranger and violinist.

Brice writes orchestral arrangements for various artists and has toured and recorded with several major pop and rock acts, including Placebo, Kanye West, Sugababes, Boy George, Westlife, Sophie Ellis-Bextor, Patrick Wolf and Simply Red. In addition, she performs solo and released her solo debut Postcards From in June 2016 through Bella Union.

== Biography ==
After graduating from King's College London and the Royal Academy of Music, London, Brice started playing violin onstage with Dream City Film Club and featured on their album In the Cold Light of Morning (Beggars Banquet, 1999). Around this time she also began performing with other London-based acts including Tram, Suzanne Rhatigan, Simon Breed, Menlo Park and Jack. Michael J. Sheehy's solo album "Sweet Blue Gene" was the first album to feature Brice's string arrangements.

== Music ==
Brice then spent several years as a session violinist in London, appearing regularly on TV with numerous Top 40 Chart Acts including Placebo, Kanye West, Will Young, Gorillaz, Ed Sheeran Westlife, Il Divo, Sugababes, Sophie Ellis-Bextor, Boy George, Ian Brown and Ronan Keating (Live from Abbey Road, Popworld, Top of the Pops, Strictly Come Dancing, This Morning, Parkinson) whilst still writing and performing with lesser known artists. More recently, she has focused on arranging and performing with more alternative-minded artists and singer/songwriters. Brice has a long-term connection with Bella Union Records and has written, toured and recorded with John Grant, Midlake, Roy Harper, Stephanie Dosen and several of their other artists.

As an orchestral arranger when has worked with the BBC Philharmonic, Royal Northern Sinfonia, Sinfonia Cymru, Deutsches Filmorchester Babelsberg, Metropol Orchestra and Zurich Chamber Orchestra.

== Placebo ==
Fiona Brice had worked with various other bands until approached by members of the band Placebo to write music with them. Brice collaborated with the band on numerous albums, her latest being their 2013 album Loud Like Love. Brice played shows with the band until she ultimately began touring with the band and performing violin onstage with the other members of the band. Whilst being involved with Placebo, she continued to work with other artists, notably Michael J. Sheehy and Patrick Wolf, and write original orchestral music. After countless shows, it was announced on 19 June 2017 on Placebo's Instagram page that Brice would be stepping down from her role on tour with the band.

== Discography ==
Orchestral arrangements include the following albums:

- Scott Michael Cavagan – Standing In The Rain (2017) (backing vocals)
- Placebo – "MTV Unplugged" (2015) (string arrangements, violin, piano, backing vocals, whirly tube, glockenspiel)
- John Grant with the BBC Philharmonic Orchestra – Live in Concert (2014) (orchestral arrangements, additional vocals & piano)
- Anna Calvi – "One Breath" (2013) (string arrangements, conducting)
- Placebo – "Loud Like Love" (2013) (string arrangements)
- John Grant – "Pale Green Ghosts" (2013) (string & brass arrangements)
- The Separate – Orchestral Variations V.01 (2012) (string arrangements)
- Sarah Jaffe – "The Body Wins" (2012) (orchestral arrangements)
- Patrick Wolf – "Lupercalia" (2011) (orchestral arrangements)
- John Grant – Queen of Denmark (2010) (arrangements, violin)
- Placebo – Battle for the Sun (2009)
- Patrick Wolf – The Bachelor (2009)
- Michael J. Sheehy and the Hired Mourners – The Rise and Fall of Francis Delaney (2009) (arrangements, violin)
- Gemma Ray – Lights Out Zoltar! (2009) (arrangements, violin)
- Lucas Renney – Strange Glory (2009)
- Howard Jones – Ordinary Heroes (2009)
- Andy Hunter – Colour (2008)
- Amy Studt – My Paper Made Men (2008) (Track "Walking Out")
- Anthony Reynolds – British Ballads (2008) (arrangements, violin)
- Kate Nash – Made of Bricks (2007)
- Kill the Young – Proud Sponsors of Boredom (2007) (Track "Television Show")
- Kelly Jones – Only the Names have been Changed (2007)
- Stephanie Dosen – A Lily for the Spectre (2007) (arrangements, violin)
- Michael J. Sheehy – Ghost on the Motorway (2007) (arrangements, violin)
- The Servant – How to Destroy a Relationship (2006)
- The Feeling – Twelve Stops and Home (2006) (Track "I Miss You") (arrangements, violin)
- Placebo – Meds (2006)
- Ed Harcourt – The Beautiful Lie (2005) (Tracks "You Only Call Me When You're Drunk" and "The Drug")
- Clearlake – Amber (2005) (arrangements, violin)
- Vashti Bunyan – Lookaftering (2005) (Track "The Same but Different") (additional arrangement, violin)
- The Jeevas – Cowboys and Indians (2004) (Tracks "Back Home" and "How Much do You Suck?") (violin)
- Mr Wright – Goodnight Baby (2004) (arrangements, violin)
- Tram – A Kind of Closure (2002) (string and brass arrangements, violin)
- Michael J. Sheehy – Ill Gotten Gains (2001) (arrangements, violin)
- Tram – Frequently Asked Questions (2000) (arrangements, violin)
- Michael J. Sheehy – Sweet Blue Gene (2000) (arrangements, violin)
- Dream City Film Club – In the Cold Light of Morning (1998) (arrangements, violin)

== Filmography ==
Brice appeared in the following films:

- The Making of Battle for the Sun: The Album (Placebo documentary)
- Vashti Bunyan: From Here to Before (documentary directed by Kieran Evans)
- Donavon Frankenreiter, The Abbey Road Sessions
- Kanye West – Late Orchestration (Kanye West live at Abbey Road)
- David Axelrod Live at the Royal Festival Hall
