= Bengali Bantam Youth Experience! =

Studio album by Black Star Liner
- Released: 1999
- Genre: Trance rock
- Length: 41:31
- Label: Warner Music UK

Black Star Liner chronology
Superfly and Bindi EP (1998)	Bengali Bantam Youth Experience! (1999)	Twelve Inch Confrontation Mix EP (2000)

Bengali Bantam Youth Experience! is an album by the English band Black Star Liner, released in 1999. "Superfly and Bindi" was released as a single and peaked at No. 78 on the UK Singles Chart. The album was nominated for the 1999 Mercury Music Prize. The band supported the album with a UK tour.

== Production ==
The album's sound was in part influenced by the music preferences of vocalist Choque Hosein's international relatives. He was skeptical of being lumped in with the Asian Underground movement, although noted the increased attention. Many of the songs are instrumentals that employ sitars and tablas. "Silvini" uses Yorkshire dialect to lampoon England's fascination with Indian culture. "Low BMW" is about the automotive preference of many English Indians. "Pink Rupee" concerns gay life in Asian society.

== Critical reception ==
Professional ratings
Review scores
Source	Rating
Birmingham Post	4/5 stars
Calgary Herald	3.5/5 stars
The Gazette	8/10

The Independent noted that "the band derives most of its idiosyncratic character ... from the Indian-Trinidadian vocalist Choque Hossein, whose declamatory toasting style is in the tradition of Bo Diddley and Beefheart and Big Youth: loud and enigmatic and often funny, too." Music Week said that the album "features brief bursts of history-informed rock cross-pollinated with Eastern sounds and Choque's upfront personality." The Observer opined that "at their best, their instrumentals evoke the urban tension of Massive Attack and the Specials' 'Ghost Town'." The Guardian stated that "nobody has ever sounded like this, principally because Kraftwerk weren't born in New Delhi and the Future Sound of London never left their studio."

In 2024, Uncut placed the album at No. 465 on its list of the "500 Greatest Albums of the 1990s".

== Track listing ==
No.	Title	Length
1.	"Sita D"	3:36
2.	"Swimmer"	4:43
3.	"Low BMW"	2:28
4.	"Gurdeep's Yellow Funk"	4:06
5.	"Superfly and Bindi"	3:47
6.	"Pink Rupee"	3:14
7.	"Ethnic Suicide of the Volga Boatmen"	3:58
8.	"Inder Automatic"	3:39
9.	"Khaatoon"	3:06
10.	"Silvini"	3:33
11.	"Dark Shadow"	3:04
12.	"Intafada Powder Line"	2:17
Total length:		41:31
