= Black Star Liner =

English band

- Origin: Leeds, England
- Genres: House, techno, ambient house, reggae, dub, Asian
- Years active: 1994–present
- Members: Choque Hosein; Tom Salmon; Chris Harrop

Black Star Liner were formed in Leeds in 1994, by Choque Hosein, Tom Salmon, and Chris Harrop. Their music consisted of a mix of Asian music (sitar and tabla), dance music and dub.

== History ==
They formed Soundclash Records to release their initial recordings - "Smoke the Prophets" EP, and "High Turkish Influence". After receiving the single of the week award in the NME magazine for "Smoke the Prophets", they recorded three Peel Sessions, the first of which was broadcast in April 1995.

The Peel session enabled them to secure a recording contract with EXP, which was run by Graham Brown-Martin with A&R by Feargal Sharkey from The Undertones and Richard Norris from The Grid. Their debut album, Yemen Cutta Connection was released in September 1996, with a press launch on Dartmoor involving Jimmy Cauty and Bill Drummond from The KLF. The album received critical praise, including album of the week in The Guardian.

After the demise of EXP, Rob Dickens from WEA signed Black Star Liner, and they recorded their second album Bengali Bantam Youth Experience!, which featured the single "Superfly and Bindi". Again receiving substantial critical acclaim, the album was also nominated for the 1999 Mercury Music Prize. and their live act was also praised.

Labelled as part of the Asian Underground, they worked with Tjinder Singh's Cornershop and are featured in the book, Brimful of Asia.

== Discography ==
- "Smoke The Prophets" EP (12") Soundclash 1994
- "High Turkish Influence" (12") Soundclash 1995
- "The Jaws" EP (10") EXP Recordings 1995
- "Haláal Rock" EP (CD, EP) EXP Recordings 1996
- "Haláal Rock" EP (12") EXP Recordings 1996
- "Harmon Session Special XI" (12") EXP Recordings 1996
- Yemen Cutta Connection (LP) EXP Recordings 1996
- Yemen Cutta Connection (CD) EXP Recordings 1996
- "Rock Freak (CD, Maxi)" WEA International Inc. 1997
- "Rock Freak EP (12")" Warner Music UK Ltd. 1997
- "Superfly And Bindi (CD, Maxi)" WEA International Inc. 1998
- "Superfly And Bindi (12", Promo)" WEA International Inc. 1998
- "Superfly And Bindi (12")" Warner Music UK Ltd. 1998
- Bengali Bantam Youth Experience! (CD) Warner Music UK Ltd. 1999
- "Twelve Inch Confrontation Mix" (CD) Echo Beach 2000
- "Yemen Cutta Connection" (CD) Echo Beach 2001
