= Live in Rotterdam =

Live album by Roller Trio
- Released: 17 July 2014
- Genre: Jazz

Roller Trio chronology
Fracture (2014)	Live in Rotterdam (2014)

Live in Rotterdam is a Roller Trio album recorded live at the 2014 EBU European Jazz Competition finals in Rotterdam. It was broadcast on Jazz on 3 (BBC Radio 3).

One week before the performance, saxophonist James Mainwaring broke a bone in his right hand, making the band unable to play their planned set. In one week they wrote a new half hour set of material for one handed sax. Mainwaring also used effects pedals.

== Track list ==
No.	Title	Length
1.	"Intro"	1:56
2.	"Blue"	4:27
3.	"Fractures"	9:51
4.	"Tight Rope"	4:58
5.	"Hammer/Nail"	10:41
