= Mercury Prize =

UK music award

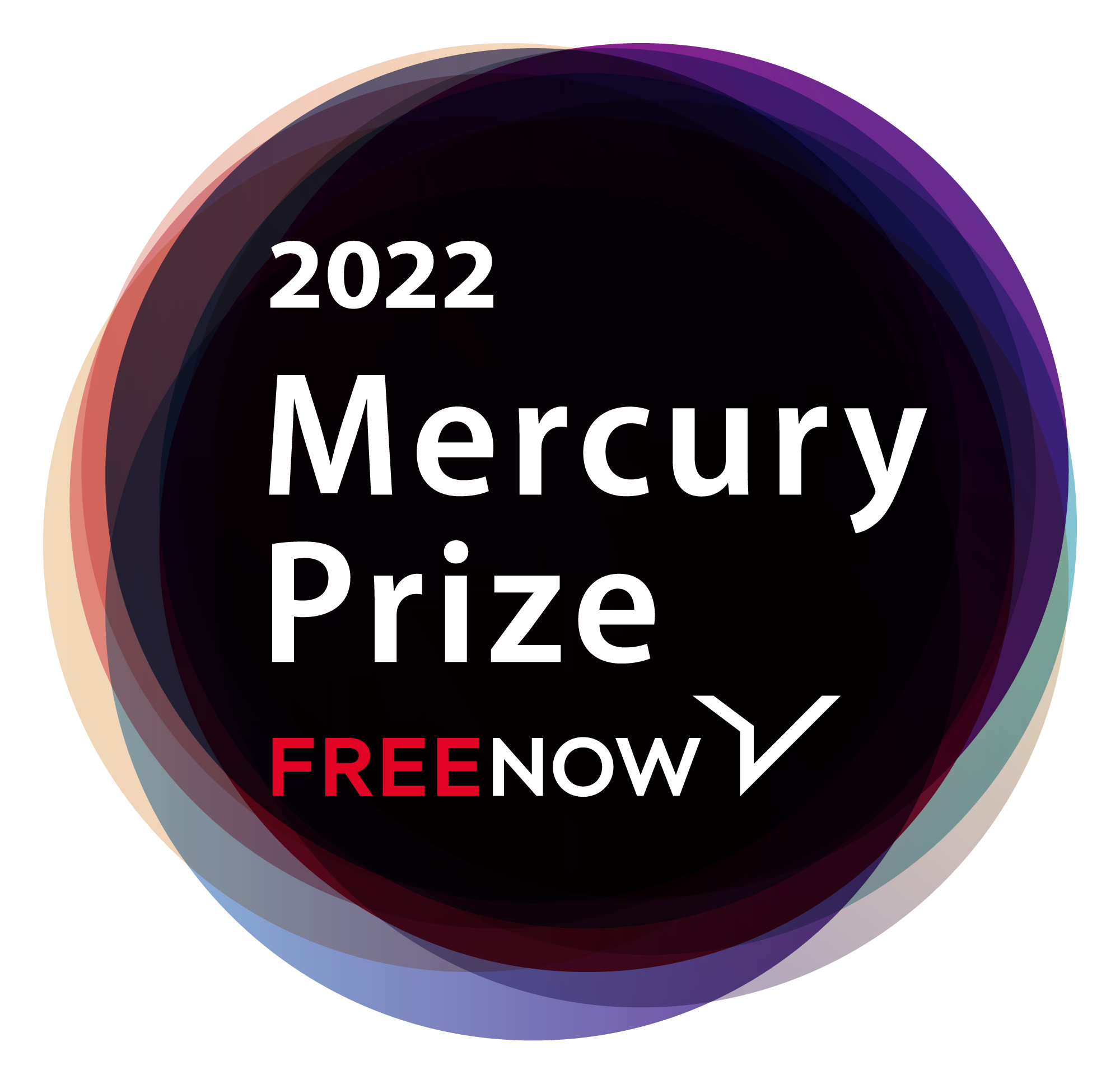
- 2022 Mercury Prize logo
- Awarded for: Best album from the United Kingdom or Ireland
- Date: Every September or October
- Venue: Eventim Apollo (1992-2019, 2021-23); Abbey Road Studios (2024); Utilita Arena Newcastle (2025, 2026)
- Formerly called: Mercury Music Prize
- Reward: £25,000
- First award: 9 September 1992; 34 years ago
- Currently held by: Raye – This Music May Contain Hope (2026)

Highlights
- Most wins: PJ Harvey (2 wins)
- Most nominations: Radiohead and Arctic Monkeys (5 nominations)
- Website: mercuryprize.com

The Mercury Prize, formerly called the Mercury Music Prize, is an annual music prize awarded for the best album released by a musical act from the United Kingdom or Ireland. It was created by Jon Webster and Robert Chandler in association with the British Phonographic Industry and British Association of Record Dealers in 1992 as an alternative to the Brit Awards.

== Format and eligibility ==
Any album released by a British or Irish artist, or by a band where over 50% of the members are British or Irish, may be submitted for consideration by their record label. There is a fee for submission. Twelve submitted albums are shortlisted for the prize, chosen based solely on their musical merit and irrespective of how popular or successful an album or act that has been submitted may have been in the previous calendar year. The shortlist is chosen by an independent panel of musicians, music presenters, music producers, music journalists, festival organisers, and other figures in the music industry in the UK and Ireland.

The prize is open to all types of music, including pop, rock, folk, urban, grime, dance, jazz, blues, electronica and classical. Presentation of the awards usually takes place at an Awards Show in October, after the shortlist is announced at the Album of the Year Launch in September. It is often observed that bands whose albums are shortlisted, or win the prize, experience a large increase in album sales, particularly for lesser known acts. Each shortlisted artist receives a specially commissioned 'Albums of the Year' trophy at the Awards Show. Unlike some other music awards, the overall winner of the Mercury Prize also receives a cheque for £25,000 and an additional winner's trophy.

== History ==
The prize was originally sponsored by Mercury Communications, a brand owned by Cable & Wireless, from which the prize gets its name. It was later sponsored by Technics (1998 to 2001), Panasonic (2002 and 2003), Nationwide Building Society (2004 to 2008) and Barclaycard (2009–14). The 2015 prize was sponsored by the BBC, while in 2016 it was announced that a three-year deal had been struck with Hyundai to sponsor the event. It was sponsored by Free Now, as part of a multi-year deal that began in 2022. In 2024, the award lost their deal with Freenow, prompting the cancellation of the ceremony and live performances for that year. In 2025 it was announced that the ceremony would take place in Newcastle, the first time it would be outside London.

To date, PJ Harvey is the only artist to have won the award on more than one occasion (in 2001 and 2011). She was also the first female solo artist to receive the award. Alex Turner has received six nominations, five as a member of Arctic Monkeys and one with The Last Shadow Puppets, winning once. Thom Yorke has six nominations, five with Radiohead and one for The Eraser, but has never won.

The awards ceremony was postponed for the first, and so far only, time in 2022 following the death of Queen Elizabeth II.

== Reputation ==
The Mercury Prize can have a considerable effect on sales for those artists who are shortlisted. Elbow saw a 700% sales increase of their album The Seldom Seen Kid after winning the Prize in 2008. In their winner's speech, Elbow's frontman Guy Garvey said that winning the Mercury Prize was "quite literally the best thing that has ever happened to us". Similarly, sales of The xx's winning album rose by 450% the day after they won the 2010 Mercury Prize and 2013 winner James Blake saw a 2,500% sales increase on Amazon after he was announced as the winner of the 2013 Mercury Prize. 2011 winner PJ Harvey's album Let England Shake jumped from number 181 to 24 in the UK official charts the week after the 2011 Awards Show.

Despite being regarded by many as highly prestigious, it has been suggested that having an album nominated for or winning the Mercury Prize could be a curse on a career in music.

In 2001, the band Gorillaz requested that their eponymous debut album be withdrawn from the shortlist, with cartoon bassist Murdoc Niccals saying that winning the award would be "like carrying a dead albatross round your neck for eternity".

All genres of music are eligible for entry, and it is stated that all are treated equally, with only the music on the album being taken into account. Simon Frith, chair of the Mercury Prize judging panel, has said that albums are chosen because they are the "strongest" each year, rather than according to genre. However, the presence of classical, folk and jazz recordings has been cited by some as anomalous, arguing that comparisons with the other nominees can be invidious. Classical acts to have an album nominated have included John Tavener, Peter Maxwell Davies, Gavin Bryars and Nicholas Maw. None has ever won, and there has not been a shortlisted classical album since 2002.

The Mercury Prize also has a reputation for being awarded to outside chances rather than the favourites. The 1994 award winner was Elegant Slumming by the pop act M People, which some felt was a controversial decision considering the shortlist included popular albums from Britpop figureheads Paul Weller, Blur and Pulp, and electronica band The Prodigy.

Other music journalists critical of the awards stated that the 2005 award should not have been given to Antony and the Johnsons for their album I Am a Bird Now as, although they are British-born and therefore eligible for the Prize, the band was based in the United States. In 2006, Isobel Campbell's collaboration with Mark Lanegan, Ballad of the Broken Seas, was included in the shortlist, despite Lanegan being American, as the album was eligible due to Campbell's British citizenship, while Guillemots, whose album was also shortlisted in 2006, contained band members from Brazil and Canada, although the majority were from the United Kingdom.

In 2020, pop musician Rina Sawayama decried the Mercury Prize rules, which stated that only British and Irish citizens would be eligible for the Prize. Sawayama holds a Japanese passport, a country that prohibits dual citizenship, and was not eligible for her 2020 album SAWAYAMA, despite having living in the United Kingdom for 25 years. This prompted a change in the eligibility criteria for both the Mercury Prize and the BRIT Awards in 2021, and under the new rules, artists who "have been permanently resident in the UK or Ireland for more than five years" qualify for the Mercury Prize.

Current eligibility criteria state that all albums must be available to buy as a digital release in the UK. In September 2013, My Bloody Valentine vocalist and guitarist Kevin Shields expressed concerns about the award in an interview with The Guardian, accusing the Mercury Prize's organisers of "banning" the band's self-released album, m b v, from the shortlist nominations and addressing the nomination criteria, which he claimed branded the album "virtually illegal".

It has been noted that heavy metal has been overlooked by the prize. A 2013 article by Vice on the Mercury Prize said "Metal certainly never gets a look-in, not even on the official entry information form: 'The Prize is open to all types of music, including pop, rock, folk, hip-hop, R'n'B, dance, soul, jazz, blues, electronica, classical…'" The only metal record that has ever been nominated for the Mercury Prize is Troublegum by Therapy? in 1994. In 2011, Mercury chair of judges Frith said "[Metal] is a niche that a lot of people don't listen to." In 2011, The Guardian music critic Alexis Petridis agreed that the Mercury Prize underrepresented heavy metal, but argued that this actually benefitted the genre because "At least part of metal's appeal is its outsider status."

The 2024 Prize was the first time in its history that the show did not have a live audience, due to the award's failure to attract a sponsor.

When English Teacher won the award in 2024, they became the first winner from outside of London since Young Fathers in 2014.

== Winners and shortlisted nominees ==
Year	Winner	Shortlisted nominees	Image	Ref(s)
1992 (1st)	Primal Scream – Screamadelica	Barry Adamson – Soul Murder; Jah Wobble's Invaders of the Heart – Rising Above Bedlam; The Jesus and Mary Chain – Honey's Dead; Bheki Mseleku – Celebration; Saint Etienne – Foxbase Alpha; Simply Red – Stars; U2 – Achtung Baby; John Tavener and Steven Isserlis – The Protecting Veil; Young Disciples – Road to Freedom	Person (vocalist) performing on stage	
1993 (2nd)	Suede – Suede	Apache Indian – No Reservations; The Auteurs – New Wave; Gavin Bryars – Jesus' Blood Never Failed Me Yet; Dina Carroll – So Close; PJ Harvey – Rid of Me; New Order – Republic; Stereo MCs – Connected; Sting – Ten Summoner's Tales; Stan Tracey – Portraits Plus	Five men sitting at a table at a press conference	
1994 (3rd)	M People – Elegant Slumming	Blur – Parklife; Ian McNabb – Head Like a Rock; Shara Nelson – What Silence Knows; Michael Nyman – The Piano Concerto/MGV; The Prodigy – Music for the Jilted Generation; Pulp – His 'n' Hers; Take That – Everything Changes; Therapy? – Troublegum; Paul Weller – Wild Wood		
1995 (4th)	Portishead – Dummy	Guy Barker – Into the Blue; Elastica – Elastica; PJ Harvey – To Bring You My Love; Leftfield – Leftism; James MacMillan – Seven Last Words from the Cross; Van Morrison – Days Like This; Oasis – Definitely Maybe; Supergrass – I Should Coco; Tricky – Maxinquaye		
1996 (5th)	Pulp – Different Class	Artists for War Child – Help; Black Grape – It's Great When You're Straight... Yeah; Peter Maxwell Davies/BBC Philharmonic – The Beltane Fire / Caroline Mathilde; Manic Street Preachers – Everything Must Go; Mark Morrison – Return of the Mack; Oasis – (What's the Story) Morning Glory?; Courtney Pine – Modern Day Jazz Stories; Underworld – Second Toughest in the Infants; Norma Waterson – Norma Waterson		
1997 (6th)	Roni Size & Reprazent – New Forms	The Chemical Brothers – Dig Your Own Hole; Beth Orton – Trailer Park; Primal Scream – Vanishing Point; The Prodigy – The Fat of the Land; Radiohead – OK Computer; Spice Girls – Spice; Suede – Coming Up; John Tavener – Svyati; Mark-Anthony Turnage – Your Rockaby		
1998 (7th)	Gomez – Bring It On	4hero – Two Pages; Asian Dub Foundation – Rafi's Revenge; Eliza Carthy – Red Rice; Catatonia – International Velvet; Cornershop – When I Was Born for the 7th Time; Massive Attack – Mezzanine; Propellerheads – Decksandrumsandrockandroll; Pulp – This Is Hardcore; John Surman – Proverbs and Songs; The Verve – Urban Hymns; Robbie Williams – Life thru a Lens		
1999 (8th)	Talvin Singh – Ok	Thomas Adès – Asyla; Denys Baptiste – Be Where You Are; Black Star Liner – Bengali Bantam Youth Experience!; Blur – 13; The Chemical Brothers – Surrender; Faithless – Sunday 8PM; Manic Street Preachers – This Is My Truth Tell Me Yours; Beth Orton – Central Reservation; Kate Rusby – Sleepless; Stereophonics – Performance and Cocktails; Underworld – Beaucoup Fish		
2000 (9th)	Badly Drawn Boy – The Hour of Bewilderbeast	Richard Ashcroft – Alone with Everybody; Coldplay – Parachutes; MJ Cole – Sincere; Death in Vegas – The Contino Sessions; The Delgados – The Great Eastern; Doves – Lost Souls; Helicopter Girl – How to Steal the World; Leftfield – Rhythm and Stealth; Nicholas Maw – Violin Concerto; Nitin Sawhney – Beyond Skin; Kathryn Williams – Little Black Numbers	A man playing a guitar and singing on stage. He is wearing a denim jacket and woolen cap	
2001 (10th)	PJ Harvey – Stories from the City, Stories from the Sea	Basement Jaxx – Rooty; Elbow – Asleep in the Back; Goldfrapp – Felt Mountain; Gorillaz – Gorillaz (nomination withdrawn at the request of the band); Ed Harcourt – Here Be Monsters; Tom McRae – Tom McRae; Radiohead – Amnesiac; Susheela Raman – Salt Rain; Super Furry Animals – Rings Around the World; Turin Brakes – The Optimist LP; Zero 7 – Simple Things	A girl singing and playing a guitar on stage	
2002 (11th)	Ms. Dynamite – A Little Deeper	Guy Barker – Soundtrack; The Bees – Sunshine Hit Me; David Bowie – Heathen; The Coral – The Coral; Doves – The Last Broadcast; The Electric Soft Parade – Holes in the Wall; Gemma Hayes – Night on My Side; Beverley Knight – Who I Am; Roots Manuva – Run Come Save Me; Joanna MacGregor – Play; The Streets – Original Pirate Material		
2003 (12th)	Dizzee Rascal – Boy in da Corner	Athlete – Vehicles and Animals; Eliza Carthy – Anglicana; Coldplay – A Rush of Blood to the Head; The Darkness – Permission to Land; Floetry – Floetic; Soweto Kinch – Conversations with the Unseen; Lemon Jelly – Lost Horizons; The Thrills – So Much for the City; Martina Topley-Bird – Quixotic; Radiohead – Hail to the Thief; Terri Walker – Untitled	A man rapping on stage, with purple spotlights behind him	
2004 (13th)	Franz Ferdinand – Franz Ferdinand	Basement Jaxx – Kish Kash; Belle & Sebastian – Dear Catastrophe Waitress; Jamelia – Thank You; Keane – Hopes and Fears; Snow Patrol – Final Straw; Joss Stone – The Soul Sessions; The Streets – A Grand Don't Come for Free; Ty – Upwards; Amy Winehouse – Frank; Robert Wyatt – Cuckooland; The Zutons – Who Killed...... The Zutons?		
2005 (14th)	Antony and the Johnsons – I Am a Bird Now	Bloc Party – Silent Alarm; Coldplay – X&Y; The Go! Team – Thunder, Lightning, Strike; Hard-Fi – Stars of CCTV; Kaiser Chiefs – Employment; KT Tunstall – Eye to the Telescope; The Magic Numbers – The Magic Numbers; M.I.A. – Arular; Maxïmo Park – A Certain Trigger; Polar Bear – Held on the Tips of Fingers; Seth Lakeman – Kitty Jay		
2006 (15th)	Arctic Monkeys – Whatever People Say I Am, That's What I'm Not	Isobel Campbell and Mark Lanegan – Ballad of the Broken Seas; Editors – The Back Room; Guillemots – Through the Windowpane; Richard Hawley – Coles Corner; Hot Chip – The Warning; Muse – Black Holes & Revelations; Zoe Rahman – Melting Pot; Lou Rhodes – Beloved One; Scritti Politti – White Bread Black Beer; Sway – This Is My Demo; Thom Yorke – The Eraser		
2007 (16th)	Klaxons – Myths of the Near Future	Arctic Monkeys – Favourite Worst Nightmare; Basquiat Strings with Seb Rochford – Basquiat Strings; Bat for Lashes – Fur and Gold; Dizzee Rascal – Maths + English; Maps – We Can Create; New Young Pony Club – Fantastic Playroom; Fionn Regan – The End of History; Jamie T – Panic Prevention; The View – Hats Off to the Buskers; Amy Winehouse – Back to Black; Young Knives – Voices of Animals and Men		
2008 (17th)	Elbow – The Seldom Seen Kid	Adele – 19; British Sea Power – Do You Like Rock Music?; Burial – Untrue; Estelle – Shine; The Last Shadow Puppets – The Age of the Understatement; Laura Marling – Alas, I Cannot Swim; Neon Neon – Stainless Style; Robert Plant & Alison Krauss – Raising Sand; Portico Quartet – Knee Deep in the North Sea; Radiohead – In Rainbows; Rachel Unthank and the Winterset – The Bairns		
2009 (18th)	Speech Debelle – Speech Therapy	Bat for Lashes – Two Suns; Florence and the Machine – Lungs; Friendly Fires – Friendly Fires; Glasvegas – Glasvegas; Lisa Hannigan – Sea Sew; The Horrors – Primary Colours; The Invisible – The Invisible; Kasabian – West Ryder Pauper Lunatic Asylum; La Roux – La Roux; Led Bib – Sensible Shoes; Sweet Billy Pilgrim – Twice Born Men		
2010 (19th)	The xx – xx	Corinne Bailey Rae – The Sea; Biffy Clyro – Only Revolutions; Dizzee Rascal – Tongue n' Cheek; Foals – Total Life Forever; I Am Kloot – Sky at Night; Kit Downes Trio – Golden; Laura Marling – I Speak Because I Can; Mumford & Sons – Sigh No More; Villagers – Becoming a Jackal; Paul Weller – Wake Up the Nation; Wild Beasts – Two Dancers		
2011 (20th)	PJ Harvey – Let England Shake	Adele – 21; James Blake – James Blake; Anna Calvi – Anna Calvi; Elbow – Build a Rocket Boys!; Everything Everything – Man Alive; Ghostpoet – Peanut Butter Blues & Melancholy Jam; Katy B – On a Mission; King Creosote & Jon Hopkins – Diamond Mine; Metronomy – The English Riviera; Gwilym Simcock – Good Days At Schloss Elmau; Tinie Tempah – Disc-Overy	PJ Harvey	
2012 (21st)	alt-J – An Awesome Wave	Django Django – Django Django; Field Music – Plumb; Richard Hawley – Standing at the Sky's Edge; Ben Howard – Every Kingdom; Michael Kiwanuka – Home Again; Lianne La Havas – Is Your Love Big Enough?; Sam Lee – Ground of its Own; The Maccabees – Given to the Wild; Plan B – ill Manors; Roller Trio – Roller Trio; Jessie Ware – Devotion		
2013 (22nd)	James Blake – Overgrown	Arctic Monkeys – AM; David Bowie – The Next Day; Jake Bugg – Jake Bugg; Disclosure – Settle; Foals – Holy Fire; Jon Hopkins – Immunity; Laura Marling – Once I Was an Eagle; Laura Mvula – Sing to the Moon; Rudimental – Home; Savages – Silence Yourself; Villagers – Awayland		
2014 (23rd)	Young Fathers – Dead	Damon Albarn – Everyday Robots; Bombay Bicycle Club – So Long, See You Tomorrow; Anna Calvi – One Breath; East India Youth – Total Strife Forever; FKA Twigs – LP1; GoGo Penguin – V2.0; Jungle – Jungle; Nick Mulvey – First Mind; Polar Bear – In Each and Every One; Royal Blood – Royal Blood; Kae Tempest – Everybody Down		
2015 (24th)	Benjamin Clementine – At Least for Now	Aphex Twin – Syro; Gaz Coombes – Matador; C Duncan – Architect; Eska – Eska; Florence and the Machine – How Big, How Blue, How Beautiful; Ghostpoet – Shedding Skin; Róisín Murphy – Hairless Toys; Slaves – Are You Satisfied?; Soak – Before We Forgot How to Dream; Wolf Alice – My Love Is Cool; Jamie xx – In Colour		
2016 (25th)	Skepta – Konnichiwa	Anohni – Hopelessness; Bat for Lashes – The Bride; David Bowie – Blackstar; The Comet Is Coming – Channel the Spirits; Kano – Made in the Manor; Michael Kiwanuka – Love & Hate; Laura Mvula – The Dreaming Room; The 1975 – I Like It When You Sleep, for You Are So Beautiful yet So Unaware of It; Radiohead – A Moon Shaped Pool; Savages – Adore Life; Jamie Woon – Making Time		
2017 (26th)	Sampha – Process	alt-J – Relaxer; The Big Moon – Love in the 4th Dimension; Blossoms – Blossoms; Loyle Carner – Yesterday's Gone; Dinosaur – Together, As One; Glass Animals – How to Be a Human Being; J Hus – Common Sense; Ed Sheeran – ÷; Stormzy – Gang Signs & Prayer; Kae Tempest – Let Them Eat Chaos; The xx – I See You		
2018 (27th)	Wolf Alice – Visions of a Life	Arctic Monkeys – Tranquility Base Hotel & Casino; Everything Everything – A Fever Dream; Everything Is Recorded – Everything Is Recorded; Florence + the Machine – High as Hope; Jorja Smith – Lost & Found; King Krule – The Ooz; Lily Allen – No Shame; Nadine Shah – Holiday Destination; Noel Gallagher's High Flying Birds – Who Built the Moon?; Novelist – Novelist Guy; Sons of Kemet – Your Queen Is a Reptile		
2019 (28th)	Dave – Psychodrama	Anna Calvi – Hunter; Black Midi – Schlagenheim; Cate Le Bon – Reward; Foals – Everything Not Saved Will Be Lost – Part 1; Fontaines D.C. – Dogrel; Idles – Joy as an Act of Resistance; Little Simz – Grey Area; Nao – Saturn; SEED Ensemble – Driftglass; slowthai – Nothing Great About Britain; The 1975 – A Brief Inquiry into Online Relationships		
2020 (29th)	Michael Kiwanuka – Kiwanuka	Anna Meredith – Fibs; Charli XCX – How I'm Feeling Now; Dua Lipa – Future Nostalgia; Georgia – Seeking Thrills; Kano – Hoodies All Summer; Lanterns on the Lake – Spook the Herd; Laura Marling – Song for Our Daughter; Moses Boyd – Dark Matter; Porridge Radio – Every Bad; Sports Team – Deep Down Happy; Stormzy – Heavy Is the Head		
2021 (30th)	Arlo Parks – Collapsed in Sunbeams	Berwyn – Demotape/Vega; Black Country, New Road – For the First Time; Celeste – Not Your Muse; Floating Points, Pharoah Sanders and the London Symphony Orchestra – Promises; Ghetts – Conflict of Interest; Hannah Peel – Fir Wave; Laura Mvula – Pink Noise; Mogwai – As the Love Continues; Nubya Garcia – Source; Sault – Untitled (Rise); Wolf Alice – Blue Weekend		
2022 (31st)	Little Simz – Sometimes I Might Be Introvert	Fergus McCreadie – Forest Floor; Gwenno – Tresor; Harry Styles – Harry's House; Jessie Buckley & Bernard Butler – For All Our Days That Tear the Heart; Joy Crookes – Skin; Kojey Radical – Reason to Smile; Nova Twins – Supernova; Sam Fender – Seventeen Going Under; Self Esteem – Prioritise Pleasure; Wet Leg – Wet Leg; Yard Act – The Overload		
2023 (32nd)	Ezra Collective – Where I'm Meant to Be	Arctic Monkeys – The Car; Fred Again – Actual Life 3 (January 1 – September 9 2022); J Hus – Beautiful and Brutal Yard; Jessie Ware – That! Feels Good!; Jockstrap – I Love You Jennifer B; Lankum – False Lankum; Loyle Carner – Hugo; Olivia Dean – Messy; Raye – My 21st Century Blues; Shygirl – Nymph; Young Fathers – Heavy Heavy		
2024 (33rd)	English Teacher – This Could Be Texas	Barry Can't Swim – When Will We Land?; Berwyn – Who Am I; Beth Gibbons – Lives Outgrown; Cat Burns – Early Twenties; Charli XCX – Brat; CMAT – Crazymad, for Me; Corinne Bailey Rae – Black Rainbows; corto.alto – Bad With Names; Ghetts – On Purpose, with Purpose; The Last Dinner Party – Prelude to Ecstasy; Nia Archives – Silence Is Loud		
2025 (34th)	Sam Fender – People Watching	CMAT – Euro-Country; Emma-Jean Thackray – Weirdo; FKA Twigs – Eusexua; Fontaines D.C. – Romance; Jacob Alon – In Limerence; Joe Webb – Hamstrings & Hurricanes; Martin Carthy – Transform Me Then Into a Fish; Pa Salieu – Afrikan Alien; PinkPantheress – Fancy That; Pulp – More; Wolf Alice – The Clearing		
2026 (35th)	Raye – This Music May Contain Hope	Artists for War Child – Help(2); Dave – The Boy Who Played the Harp; Dove Ellis – Blizzard; Florence + The Machine – Everybody Scream; Jade – That's Showbiz Baby!; Knats – A Great Day in Newcastle; Kojey Radical – Don't Look Down; Nia Archives – Emotional Junglist; Olivia Dean – The Art of Loving; Paul McCartney – The Boys of Dungeon Lane; Suede – Antidepressants		

== Artists with multiple wins ==
2 wins

- PJ Harvey (2 wins 2001/2011, nominated 1993/1995/2001/2011)

== Artists with multiple nominations ==
Totals listed are for bands or artists nominated more than once under the same name. It does not include appearances on compilations (e.g. The Last Dinner Party as part of Artists for War Child) or individuals nominated separately as a soloist and group member (e.g. Robbie Williams for his Life thru a Lens and Take That's Everything Changes, or Beth Gibbons for her Lives Outgrown and Portishead's Dummy).

5 nominations

- Radiohead (no wins, nominated 1997/2001/2003/2008/2016)
- Arctic Monkeys (1 win 2006, nominated 2006/2007/2013/2018/2023)

4 nominations

- Florence and the Machine (no wins, nominated 2009/2015/2018/2026)
- Laura Marling (no wins, nominated 2008/2010/2013/2020)
- PJ Harvey (2 wins 2001/2011, nominated 1993/1995/2001/2011)
- Pulp (1 win 1996, nominated 1994/1996/1998/2025)
- Wolf Alice (1 win 2018, nominated 2015/2018/2021/2025)

3 nominations

- Anna Calvi (no wins, nominated 2011/2014/2019)
- Bat for Lashes (no wins, nominated 2007/2009/2016)
- Coldplay (no wins, nominated 2000/2003/2005)
- David Bowie (no wins, nominated 2002/2013/2016)
- Dizzee Rascal (1 win 2003, nominated 2003/2007/2010)
- Elbow (1 win 2008, nominated 2001/2008/2011)
- Foals (no wins, nominated 2010/2013/2019)
- Laura Mvula (no wins, nominated 2013/2016/2021)
- Michael Kiwanuka (1 win 2020, nominated 2012/2016/2020)
- Suede (1 win 1993, nominated 1993/1997/2026)

2 nominations

- The 1975 (no wins, nominated 2016/2019)
- Adele (no wins, nominated 2008/2011)
- alt-J (1 win 2012, nominated 2012/2017)
- Amy Winehouse (no wins, nominated 2004/2007)
- Basement Jaxx (no wins, nominated 2001/2004)
- Berwyn (no wins, nominated 2021/2024)
- Beth Orton (no wins, nominated 1997/1999)
- Blur (no wins, nominated 1994/1999)
- Charli XCX (no wins, nominated 2020/2024)
- The Chemical Brothers (no wins, nominated 1997/1999)
- CMAT (no wins, nominated 2024/2025)
- Corinne Bailey Rae (no wins, nominated 2010/2024)
- Dave (one win 2019, nominated 2019/2026)
- Doves (no wins, nominated 2000/2002)
- Eliza Carthy (no wins, nominated 1998/2003)
- Everything Everything (no wins, nominated 2011/2018)
- FKA Twigs (no wins, nominated 2014/2025)
- Fontaines D.C. (no wins, nominated 2019/2025)
- Ghetts (no wins, nominated 2021/2024)
- Ghostpoet (no wins, nominated 2011/2015)
- Guy Barker (no wins, nominated 1995/2002)
- J Hus (no wins, nominated 2017/2023)
- James Blake (1 win 2013, nominated 2011/2013)
- Jessie Ware (no wins, nominated 2012/2023)
- John Tavener (no wins, nominated 1992/1997)
- Jon Hopkins (no wins, nominated 2011/2013)
- Kae Tempest (no wins, nominated 2014/2017)
- Kano (no wins, nominated 2016/2020)
- Kojey Radical (no wins, nominated 2022/2026)
- Leftfield (no wins, nominated 1995/2000)
- Little Simz (1 win 2022, nominated 2019/2022)
- Loyle Carner (no wins, nominated 2017/2023)
- Manic Street Preachers (no wins, nominated 1996/1999)
- Nia Archives (no wins, nominated 2024/2026)
- Oasis (no wins, nominated 1995/1996)
- Olivia Dean (no wins, nominated 2023/2026)
- Paul Weller (no wins, nominated 1994/2010)
- Polar Bear (no wins, nominated 2005/2014)
- Primal Scream (1 win 1992, nominated 1992/1997)
- The Prodigy (no wins, nominated 1994/1997)
- Raye (1 win 2026, nominated 2023/2026)
- Richard Hawley (no wins, nominated 2006/2012)
- Sam Fender (1 win 2025, nominated 2022/2025)
- Savages (no wins, nominated 2013/2016)
- Stormzy (no wins, nominated 2017/2020)
- The Streets (no wins, nominated 2002/2004)
- Underworld (no wins, nominated 1996/1999)
- Villagers (no wins, nominated 2010/2013)
- Young Fathers (1 win 2014, nominated 2014/2023)
- The xx (1 win 2010, nominated 2010/2017)

== See also ==
- Scottish Album of the Year Award
- Welsh Music Prize
- Northern Ireland Music Prize
- Choice Music Prize (Ireland, including Northern Ireland)
- Polaris Music Prize (Canada)
- Prix Constantin (France)
- Shortlist Music Prize (United States)
- Australian Music Prize
- Nordic Music Prize
- Premio Ruido (Spain)
- Taite Music Prize (New Zealand)
