= Tipping Point (band) =

UK musical group

- Origin: England
- Genres: Contemporary jazz; Experimental
- Years active: 2013–present
- Labels: Lamplight Social
- Members: James Mainwaring; Matthew Bourne; Mick Bardon; Joost Hendrickx
- Website: jamesmainwaringmusic.com/tipping-point

Tipping Point is an experimental contemporary jazz quartet from England, founded in 2013 by James Mainwaring. All members are alumni of Leeds College of Music and active in other successful projects.

Tipping Point released their debut album, The Earthworm's Eye View, in October 2015 on Lamplight Social Records. The album was described as "Playful, dark, skilful and spontaneous… a surefooted trip across many persuasions in contemporary music" by John Fordham in the Guardian and to have “moments of collective beauty” by Daniel Spicer in Jazzwise. The Earthworm's Eye View was also dubbed a best album of 2015 by Jazz on 3 and The Guardian.

== Personnel ==
- James Mainwaring - saxophonist and composer
- Matthew Bourne - Fender Rhodes
- Michael Bardon - double bass
- Joost Hendrickx - drums
