= Anna Calvi (album) =

Studio album by Anna Calvi
- Released: 14 January 2011
- Recorded: Autumn 2010
- Genre: Art rock
- Length: 39:17
- Label: Domino
- Producer: Rob Ellis, Anna Calvi

Anna Calvi chronology
Anna Calvi (2011)	One Breath (2013)

Singles from Anna Calvi
- 1. "Blackout" Released: 21 March 2011; 2. "Desire" Released: 20 June 2011; 3. "Suzanne & I" Released: 12 September 2011

Anna Calvi is the debut album of British singer-songwriter Anna Calvi, released on 14 January 2011, by Domino Records. In Autumn, 2010, Calvi entered Black Box studio in France with producer Rob Ellis and, using vintage analogue equipment, created "a velvet Wall of Sound that justified the hype in the buildup to its 2011 release." The album peaked at No. 40 in the UK Album Charts reached No. 17 in France, and entered several European charts. The album was nominated for the 2011 Barclaycard Mercury Prize.

== History ==
The debut album's material had been written in Anna Calvi's parents' attic, using eight-track equipment. Of Rob Ellis, best known for his work with PJ Harvey, she said:

He’s old-school rock‘n roll… you know, 'Hit the drums harder!' Which I love. We both share a love of classical music...he loves the same composers as I do. So I didn’t have to explain what I meant when I said that I wanted a guitar or a shaker to sound like an orchestra. It was great to find someone who understood.

Calvi herself said she was proud with the album and picked out two songs where she felt she'd got close to what she ultimately wanted to achieve: "Love Won’t Be Leaving" (noted for microscopic sound detailisation) and "The Devil". "I see music very visually. And I want the music itself to express the story as much, if not more, than the lyrics. I think I achieved that on Love Won’t Be Leaving," she commented on the former. As for the latter, "It’s a good example of how I wanted to make the guitar sound like another instrument. I wanted the middle-section to sound like the strings on a Hitchcock soundtrack. It crescendos towards an explosion, but in a real and honest way. It's not about bravado," she added.

=== Singles ===
"Blackout"
Blackout reached no.18 in the Official UK Physical Singles chart on 2 April 2011.

"Blackout" (backed with the cover of “Surrender” - a classic Neapolitan song, originally “Torna a Surriento”, adapted for Elvis Presley in 1961 by Doc Pomus and Mort Shuman, with lyrics by Claude Aveling) was released as the first single from the album on 21 March 2011 and was debuted on Pitchfork in the US.

"Desire" was the second single (backed with a reworking of Leonard Cohen's "Joan of Arc") and was released on 20 June 2011. The track was available on 7" (RUG412) and via digital download (RUG412D).

"Suzanne & I" (backed with the cover of the Shirelles "Baby It's You") was released as the third single from the album on 12 September 2011.

== Reception ==
Professional ratings
Aggregate scores
Source	Rating
AnyDecentMusic?	7.6/10
Metacritic	80/100
Review scores
Source	Rating
AllMusic	4/5 stars
Evening Standard	4/5 stars
Financial Times	4/5 stars
The Guardian	4/5 stars
The Irish Times	4/5 stars
Mojo	4/5 stars
NME	9/10
Pitchfork	7.8/10
Q	3/5 stars
Uncut	4/5 stars

Upon its release, Anna Calvi received generally positive reviews from music critics. Aggregating website AnyDecentMusic? reports a score of 7.6 based on 29 professional reviews.

Reviewer Eamonn Seoige (IHeart AU), called the album "fully-formed and... an instantly engaging body of work", argued that its "key strength is honest, raw power." Describing Calvi's songs as "poetic, free-flowing, often incorporating multiple styles that frame her distinctive and kaleidoscopic vocal range," he added: "A gifted musician, possessor of a unique voice and writer of inimitable songs, Calvi is already primed for greatness." Matt James of PopMatters described Calvi as "eternally glamorous, but perennially doomed nightclub torch-song singer with a skeleton army in their closet" and her debut, never "afraid to be fantastical, striking," as "rich and strange". NME called the debut "perhaps the first great record of 2011." According to Jon O'Brien of AllMusic, this "ambitious and always intriguing debut... heralds the arrival of a unique and inventive addition to the plethora of U.K. female singer/songwriters."

Mojo placed the album at number 8 on its list of "Top 50 albums of 2011."

== Track listing ==
All tracks are written by Anna Calvi.

No.	Title	Length
1.	"Rider to the Sea"	2:40
2.	"No More Words"	3:51
3.	"Desire"	3:51
4.	"Suzanne & I"	4:11
5.	"First We Kiss"	3:05
6.	"The Devil"	4:34
7.	"Blackout"	4:05
8.	"I'll Be Your Man"	3:10
9.	"Morning Light"	4:13
10.	"Love Won't Be Leaving"	5:37

== Personnel ==
- Anna Calvi – lead vocals, bass guitar, guitar, organ, piano, production, string arrangements, strings, violin
- Brian Eno – piano, backing vocals (tracks 3, 4)
- Mally Harpaz – drums, harmonium, percussion
- Daniel Maiden-Wood – bass, drums, backing vocals
- Dave Okumu – backing vocals (track 2)

Technical personnel

- Peter Deimel – engineering
- Rob Ellis – production
- David Odlux – assistant
- Chris Potter – mastering
- Jimmy Robertson – engineering
- Craig Silvey – mixing
- Pritpal Soor – mixing, production
- Emma Nathan - artwork

== Charts ==
Chart (2011)	Peak position
Austrian Albums (Ö3 Austria)	33
Belgian Albums (Ultratop Flanders)	9
Belgian Albums (Ultratop Wallonia)	36
Dutch Albums (Album Top 100)	68
French Albums (SNEP)	17
German Albums (Offizielle Top 100)	70
Irish Albums (IRMA)	72
Irish Independent Albums (IRMA)	7
Italian Albums (FIMI)	93
Scottish Albums (OCC)	66
Swedish Albums (Sverigetopplistan)	55
Swiss Albums (Schweizer Hitparade)	40
UK Albums (OCC)	40
UK Independent Albums (OCC)	3
US Heatseekers Albums (Billboard)	42

== Sales ==
Region	Certification	Certified units/sales
France	—	35,000
Summaries
Worldwide		170,000
