= Led Bib =

Jazz group from London

- Origin: London, England
- Genre: Modern jazz
- Years active: 2003–present
- Labels: Cuneiform Records, RareNoiseRecords
- Members: Mark Holub; Pete Grogan; Chris Williams; Liran Donin
- Website: www.ledbib.com

Led Bib is a modern jazz group from London, England. Its fourth album, Sensible Shoes, was shortlisted for the 2009 Mercury Prize.

== History ==
Mark Holub, the band's drummer and leader, formed the group in 2003 while studying at Middlesex University. Their debut album, Arboretum, won the Peter Whittingham Jazz Award in 2005. Their second album, Sizewell Tea, followed in 2007. A limited-edition live album was released in 2008. The band's fourth album, Sensible Shoes, was nominated for the 2009 Mercury Prize. Its fifth album, Bring Your Own, was released on 7 February 2011. In 2014, the band released the album The People in Your Neighbourhood and a live vinyl LP The Good Egg. In 2016, Led Bib signed with UK-based label RareNoiseRecords, and recorded two albums with them, Umbrella Weather and It's Morning. Their latest album was released on Cuneiform Records on August 29, 2025, called Hotel Pupik, and their first as a quartet since the departure of keboardist McLaren.

== Band members ==
- Mark Holub – drums
- Pete Grogan – alto saxophone
- Chris Williams – alto saxophone
- Liran Donin – double bass
- Toby McLaren – keyboards

== Discography ==
- Arboretum (2005)
- Sizewell Tea (2007)
- Live (2008)
- Sensible Shoes (2009)
- Bring Your Own (2011)
- The People in Your Neighbourhood (2014)
- The Good Egg (2014) - vinyl and download only
- Umbrella Weather (2017)
- Umbrella Weather Live (2018)
- It's Morning (2019)
- Live at Vortex Jazz Club (2020)
- Hotel Pupik (2025)
