= Hunter (Anna Calvi album) =

Studio album by Anna Calvi
- Released: 31 August 2018
- Studio: Konk (London): Anna Calvi's studio (London) (Note: Additional recording); Nick Launay's Launmower Studios (Hollywood); Ade's house (Bristol)
- Length: 43:40
- Label: Domino
- Producer: Nick Launay

Anna Calvi chronology
One Breath (2013)	Hunter (2018)

Singles from Hunter
- 1. "Don't Beat the Girl Out of My Boy" Released: 6 June 2018; 2. "Hunter" Released: 31 July 2018; 3. "As a Man" Released: 30 August 2018

Hunter is the third studio album by English singer-songwriter Anna Calvi, released on 31 August 2018 by Domino. The album was produced by Nick Launay, with additional production by Calvi. The album features Adrian Utley from Portishead and Martyn P. Casey from Nick Cave and The Bad Seeds.

Calvi announced the album on 6 June 2018. At the same time she released a single, "Don't Beat the Girl Out of My Boy", and announced a European tour in support. Calvi enlisted director Matt Lambert to produce the video for title track "Hunter". Dazed called it "an exploration of queer intimacy and self-love."

== Critical reception ==
Professional ratings
Aggregate scores
Source	Rating
AnyDecentMusic?	7.8/10
Metacritic	84/100
Review scores
Source	Rating
AllMusic	4/5 stars
The A.V. Club	A−
The Guardian	5/5 stars
The Independent	4/5 stars
Mojo	4/5 stars
NME	4/5 stars
Pitchfork	7.8/10
The Observer	3/5 stars
The Times	4/5 stars
Uncut	7/10

Hunter received widespread acclaim from music critics. At Metacritic, which assigns a normalised rating out of 100 to reviews from mainstream publications, the album received an average score of 84, based on 20 reviews. At The Guardian, critic Michael Hann praised Hunter as "glorious and triumphant" and "a record that succeeds on any terms you try to force upon it". Cameron Cook of Pitchfork noted Calvi's "remarkable evolution" and found that she "pushes her artistry to another level".

== Track listing ==
All tracks are written by Anna Calvi.

No.	Title	Length
1.	"As a Man"	3:46
2.	"Hunter"	4:11
3.	"Don't Beat the Girl Out of My Boy"	4:03
4.	"Indies or Paradise"	4:41
5.	"Swimming Pool"	4:54
6.	"Alpha"	3:40
7.	"Chain"	4:47
8.	"Wish"	5:16
9.	"Away"	4:14
10.	"Eden"	4:08
Total length:		43:40

== Personnel ==
Credits adapted from the liner notes of Hunter.

=== Musicians ===
- Anna Calvi – vocals, guitar, synths, bass, piano, percussion
- Mally Harpaz – vibraphone, glockenspiel, percussion, piano
- Alex Thomas – drums, timpani, percussion
- Adrian Utley – Solina, Moog synthesizer, Oberheim synthesizer, EBow, Mellotron, Swarmatron
- Martyn Casey – bass
- Ming Vauze – bass, synths, space station FX pedals
- Gillian Rivers – viola, violin
- Fiona Brice – violin; string arrangements on "Wish"
- Ellie Stanford – violin
- Rachel Robson – viola
- Vicky Matthews – cello

=== Technical ===
- Nick Launay – production, recording, mixing
- Anna Calvi – additional production on "Indies or Paradise" and "Wish"
- Isabel Gracefield – engineering assistance
- Josh Green – engineering assistance
- Mark Knight – engineering assistance
- T. J. Allen – recording assistance
- Atom Greenspan – Satellite Xtra engineering
- Alejandro Baima – mixing engineering assistance
- Bernie Grundman – mastering

=== Artwork ===
- Imogen Snell – visual creative direction
- Maisie Cousins – photography
- Matthew Cooper – design

== Charts ==
Chart (2018)	Peak position
Australian Digital Albums (ARIA)	48
Austrian Albums (Ö3 Austria)	32
Belgian Albums (Ultratop Flanders)	35
Belgian Albums (Ultratop Wallonia)	71
French Albums (SNEP)	59
German Albums (Offizielle Top 100)	42
Irish Independent Albums (IRMA)	18
Italian Albums (FIMI)	63
Portuguese Albums (AFP)	16
Scottish Albums (OCC)	13
Spanish Albums (Promusicae)	90
Swiss Albums (Schweizer Hitparade)	50
UK Albums (OCC)	22
UK Independent Albums (OCC)	5
