= Roller Trio =

British jazz-rock band

- Origin: Leeds, Yorkshire, England
- Genres: Jazz
- Years active: 2011–present
- Label: Edition Records
- Members: James Mainwaring, Chris Sharkey, Luke Reddin-Williams
- Past members: Luke Wynter
- Website: link

Roller Trio are a British jazz-rock trio, who formed whilst studying at Leeds College of Music in 2011. In 2012, their eponymous debut studio album was nominated for the Mercury Prize alongside a nomination for the band as "Best Jazz Act" at the MOBO Awards that year. In performance, John Fordham of The Guardian described their preview gig for the Mercury prize [as having] "the same wild insouciance that has made their sound a howl of fresh air." DJ and broadcaster Gilles Peterson described their music as "Dark, menacing, bass heavy – the new sound of UK jazzzzzzz!" They are known for their "epic memorably singalong melody hooks and blistering riffs".

In May 2017, the band reformed with TrioVD and Acoustic Ladyland guitarist Chris Sharkey replacing Luke Wynter; Their third album was released in June 2018 on Edition Records.

== Members ==
=== Current ===
- James Mainwaring – saxophones
- Chris Sharkey – Guitar/Bass
- Luke Reddin-Williams – drums

=== Past ===
- Luke Wynter

== Discography ==
Studio albums

- Roller Trio (2012)
- Fracture (2014)
- New Devices (2018) Edition Records

Live albums

- Live at Jazz in the Round (2012)
- Live in Rotterdam (2014)
