= Strange Weather (EP) =

EP by Anna Calvi
- Released: 15 July 2014
- Recorded: 2013/2014
- Genre: Art rock
- Label: Domino Recording Company
- Producer: Thomas Bartlett

Anna Calvi chronology
One Breath (2013)	Strange Weather (2014)	Live for Burberry (2017)

Strange Weather is an extended play (EP) by singer-songwriter Anna Calvi, consisting entirely of covers. The EP was released on 15 July 2014.

The album was recorded in New York with producer Thomas Bartlett and mastered at Abbey Road Studios by Miles Showell.

David Byrne issued a press release describing his involvement with the record:

"I’m a big fan of Anna's two records... and I caught her tour after her first record at Bowery Ballroom here in NY. ‘Epic’ I think is the word that is often used. So when Thomas Bartlett said he was going to be in the studio producing an EP of Anna doing covers I immediately agreed to join in. I was invited to suggest songs and I loved the last Keren Ann record and I thought Strange Weather had a haunting quality that might suit Anna.... so we did that, and Anna then suggested I join in on the Connan Mockasin track she'd done too."

A music video for the title track, "Strange Weather", was released on 27 May 2014. It was directed in New York City by Alan Del Rio Ortiz and stars Kate Lyn Sheil. The single "Strange Weather" appeared on the French singles chart peaking at #123.

== Critical reception ==
Gigwise described the leading track, "Papi Pacify", as having a "Morricone-esque, cinematic Western sense of melodrama, whilst retaining the shudder-inducing intimacy of the original. It's gorgeous - not least for the vulnerability displayed in Calvi's soaring vocal."

NME awarded the EP a 7/10, saying: "Potential cover performers take note: this is how you do it."

The Skinny rated it four stars out of five: "Diverging from the fiery nature of some of Calvi’s original material, Strange Weather stands testament to a confident stylistic distinctiveness that spreads well over many textures."

== Track listing ==
No.	Title	Original Artist	Length
1.	"Papi Pacify"	FKA Twigs	4:22
2.	"I’m the Man That Will Find You" (featuring David Byrne)	Connan Mockasin	4:56
3.	"Ghost Rider"	Suicide	2:42
4.	"Strange Weather" (featuring David Byrne)	Keren Ann	5:32
5.	"Lady Grinning Soul"	David Bowie	3:56

== Personnel ==
- Anna Calvi – vocals (lead), guitar
- David Byrne - vocals
- Matt Johnson – drums
- Nico Muhly - string arrangements
- Thomas Bartlett - Producer
- Miles Showell - Mastering
