= Dream City Film Club =

- Origin: North London, England
- Genres: Rock
- Years active: July 1995 – 1999
- Past members: Michael J. Sheehy; Andrew Park; Laurence Ash; Alex Vald; Patrick McCarthy

Dream City Film Club were an English, North London-based rock band, founded in July 1995.

Their sound was difficult to categorize in that it encompassed tortured lovelorn balladry, avant-garde flourishes, Tin Pan Alley, straightforward rock and gospel yearnings in both lyrics and subject matter. Ultimately, Dream City Film Club failed to find enough of an audience to sustain them.

Vocalist Michael J. Sheehy had been working as a solo singer/songwriter for several years when he met Alex Vald and Laurence Ash, who quickly began writing songs with Sheehy. Upon the demise of another local group, Breed, bassist Andrew Park joined. The band's name came from a news story Sheehy had seen about an arsonist who had burned down a members-only porno theatre. They played their first gig as Dream City Film Club on 31 July 1995.

They released a single, "Crawl", for the underground fanzine The Organ in early 1996. Soon after, they were contacted by Beggar's Banquet and recorded their eponymous debut album in late 1996, later releasing it on 26 May 1997.

According to Sheehy, the English press reaction to the first single, "Perfect Piece of Trash", was almost unanimous in its derision. After parting with Vald, DCFC continued on as a three piece, recording its second and final album, In the Cold Light of Morning featuring a more expansive sound best realized on the epic "God Will Punish the Pervert Preacher".

The group disbanded in 1999. Michael J. Sheehy subsequently recorded three solo albums for Beggar's Banquet and two for Glitterhouse, and has fronted Saint Silas Intercession with his brother Patrick. During the early 2000s, Alex Vald worked as half of experimental pop band Datapuddle. In 2015, Sheehy and Vald reunited as the pop-noir duo United Sound of Joy.

In a retrospective biography of the group, AllMusic called them "one of England's most underrated bands of the 1990s."

== Line-up ==
- Michael J. Sheehy – vocals, guitars, keyboards
- Andrew Park – bass guitar, keyboards, guitars
- Laurence Ash – Drums, percussion
- Alex Vald – guitar (until 1997)
- Patrick McCarthy – guitar (1997–1999)

== Discography ==
- Dream City Film Club (Beggar's Banquet, 1997)
- In the Cold Light of Morning (Beggar's Banquet, 1999)
- Stranger Blues EP (Beggar's Banquet, 1999)

Michael J. Sheehy solo albums:

- Sweet Blue Gene (Beggar's Banquet, 2000)
- Ill Gotten Gains (Beggar's Banquet, 2001)
- No Longer My Concern (Beggar's Banquet, 2002)
- Ghost on the Motorway (Glitterhouse, 2007)
- With These Hands: The Rise and Fall of Francis Delaney (Glitterhouse, 2009)
