= Roller Trio (album) =

Studio album by Roller Trio
- Released: 15 August 2012
- Recorded: 2012
- Genre: Jazz, rock
- Label: F-IRE Collective
- Producer: Tim Bazell

Roller Trio chronology
Roller Trio (2012)	Fracture (2014)

Roller Trio is the eponymous debut studio album by Leeds Jazz-Rock ensemble Roller Trio. The album, released in August 2012 through British F-IRE Collective record label, was a nominee for the 2012 Mercury Prize.

== Track listing ==
No.	Title	Length
1.	"Deep Heat"	6:40
2.	"Rollertoaster"	8:07
3.	"Howdy Saudi"	4:29
4.	"R-O-R'"	7:03
5.	"The Nail that Stands Up"	5:04
6.	"The Zone"	11:15
7.	"A Dark Place to Think"	5:29
8.	"The Interrupters"	3:46
9.	"Where's My Whip"	6:00

== Personnel ==
Roller Trio

- James Mainwaring– saxophone, effects
- Luke Wynter – guitar, effects
- Luke Reddin-Williams – drums

Production

- Tim Bazell – production, engineering. mixing
