= Pritpal Soor =

British record producer

Pritpal Soor is a London-based music producer and writer. He has produced for bands and artists such as Anna Calvi, The Loose Salute, Cheap Hotel, Out Of The Afternoon and Mancub Babywoman. He is also the vocalist and guitarist for the London punk/pop duo Flower Of Zeus.

== Music background ==
His early musical career was spent as a guitarist and writer in a handful of bands, predominately in the unsigned London band, I Own Kings. Much of this period was spent recording demos for this band and for his old schoolfriend Ian McCutcheon's band, The Loose Salute. It was this relationship that found him the production job on The Loose Salute's first album, Tuned To Love, released by Graveface Records and Heavenly Records in 2007 and 2008 respectively. He also produced their second album, Getting Over Being Under, on Graveface and Big Potato Records in 2011

His friendship with Gregg Braden (who was a temporary drummer in I Own Kings) led Soor to produce the first single, "New York", for Braden's band, Cheap Hotel, in 2008. Anna Calvi was the guitarist and vocalist for the band. She was keen to try some music outside of the band, and the two of them started recording in November 2007 at Soor's studio in Fulham, London. The sessions continued for a year and a half and these recordings formed the majority of Calvi's first album, released on Domino Records in 2011.

== Discography ==
- 2007: The Loose Salute - Tuned To Love album (Heavenly/Graveface)
- 2008: Cheap Hotel - "New York" single (Hero Rhymes With Zero)
- 2008: The Loose Salute - "Why'd We Fight" single (Heavenly)
- 2008: The Loose Salute - "Turn The Radio Up" single (Heavenly)
- 2009: Flower Of Zeus - Diamond Rings EP (Exuberent Youth)
- 2009: The Loose Salute - "The End" single comp (Mojo)
- 2010: Out Of The Afternoon - "I Won't Forget You" single (Tape Rec)
- 2010: Catch The Sun - Catch The Sun album (West One Music)
- 2011: The Loose Salute - Getting Over Being Under album (Graveface/ Big Potato)
- 2011: Mancub Babywoman - A Little Too Much 'EP (Superglad)
- 2011: Anna Calvi - Anna Calvi album (Domino)
- 2011: Anna Calvi - "Blackout" single (Domino)
- 2011: Woolf - "Woolf" single (Milk)
- 2011: Rosanne Barrr - Split Tape EP (Belly Kids)
