= The People in Your Neighbourhood =

Studio album by Led Bib
- Released: 13 May 2014
- Genre: Jazz
- Label: Cuneiform

Led Bib chronology
Bring Your Own (2011)	The People in Your Neighbourhood (2014)

Professional ratings
Aggregate scores
Source	Rating
Metacritic	82/100
Review scores
Source	Rating
MusicOMH	4/5 stars

The People in Your Neighbourhood is the sixth studio album by British jazz band Led Bib. It was released in May 2014 under Cuneiform Records.

== Track listing ==
No.	Title	Length
1.	"New Teles"	5:18
2.	"Giant Bean"	7:05
3.	"Angry Waters (lost to Sea)"	6:51
4.	"This Roofus"	5:29
5.	"Recycling Saga"	7:41
6.	"Plastic Lighthouse"	6:50
7.	"Tastes So Central"	8:30
8.	"Imperial Green"	3:08
9.	"Curly Kale"	4:55
10.	"At the Ant Farm"	7:38
11.	"Orphan Elephants"	8:56
