= Play (Joanna MacGregor album) =

Play is a 2002 album by Joanna MacGregor. The album was released on the SoundCircus label and was a nominee for the Mercury Music Prize.
