= Fracture (Roller Trio album) =

Studio album by Roller Trio
- Released: 8 December 2014
- Recorded: 2014
- Genre: Jazz, rock
- Label: Lamplight Social Records
- Producer: Sam Hobbs

Roller Trio chronology
Roller Trio (2012)	Fracture (2014)	Live in Rotterdam (2014)

Fracture is the second studio album by Leeds Jazz-Rock ensemble Roller Trio following the success of their Mercury Prize nominated debut album Roller Trio. It was released in 2014 and in The Guardian John Fordham said [Roller Trio] "have come up with a second album that’s different and diverse, and on a live show it must be a gas". London Jazz News said "This is a marker laid down by a group operating at the vanguard of contemporary jazz." The album received 4 stars in All About Jazz where the reviewer Phil Barnes said, "This ability to blend the accessible and the serious, the melodic and the experimental is a real gift".

== Track listing ==
No.	Title	Length
1.	"Reef Knot"	5:40
2.	"Doris"	6:34
3.	"Low Tide"	1:13
4.	"High Tea"	4:36
5.	"2 Minutes to 12"	5:54
6.	"Tracer"	5:23
7.	"Splinter"	5:22
8.	"Mango"	6:08
9.	"Three Pea Soup"	6:34
10.	"Tightrope"	5:38

== Personnel ==
Roller Trio

- James Mainwaring– saxophone, effects
- Luke Wynter – guitar, FX, bass
- Luke Reddin-Williams – drums

Production

- Sam Hobbs – recording, engineering, production
