= Sensible Shoes =

Studio album by Led Bib
- Released: 4 May 2009
- Recorded: 12–13 August 2008
- Genre: Modern Jazz
- Label: Cuneiform Records

Led Bib chronology
Live (2008)	Sensible Shoes (2009)

Professional ratings
Review scores
Source	Rating
Allmusic	4/5 stars
Guardian	3/5 stars

Sensible Shoes is the fourth album by Led Bib. Released on 4 May 2009, it was shortlisted for the 2009 Mercury Prize.

== Track listing ==
1. "Yes, Again" – 4:55
2. "Squirrel Carnage" – 7:10
3. "Early Morning" – 7:10
4. "Sweet Chilli" – 5:22
5. "2:4:1 [Still Equals None]" – 5:56
6. "Call Centre Labyrinth" – 7:00
7. "Water Shortage" – 7:11
8. "Flat Pack Fantasy" – 4:49
9. "Zone 4" – 9:07
