= One Breath (album) =

Studio album by Anna Calvi
- Released: 7 October 2013
- Recorded: 2013
- Genre: Art rock
- Length: 39:17
- Label: Domino
- Producer: John Congleton

Anna Calvi chronology
Anna Calvi (2011)	One Breath (2013)	Strange Weather (2014)

Singles from One Breath
- 1. "Eliza" Released: 1 October 2013; 2. "Suddenly" Released: 23 December 2013; 3. "Piece by Piece" Released: 31 March 2014

Professional ratings
Aggregate scores
Source	Rating
AnyDecentMusic?	7.5/10
Metacritic	80/100
Review scores
Source	Rating
AllMusic	4/5 stars
The Daily Telegraph	3/5 stars
The Guardian	4/5 stars
The Independent	3/5 stars
The Irish Times	4/5 stars
Mojo	4/5 stars
NME	8/10
Pitchfork	6.6/10
The Telegraph	3/5 stars
Uncut	8/10

One Breath is the second album of British singer-songwriter Anna Calvi, released on 7 October 2013, by Domino Records. The album was recorded at Black Box studios in France with mixing completed in Texas by Calvi's new producer John Congleton.

Calvi described One Breath as "the moment before you've got to open yourself up, and it's about how terrifying that is. It's scary and it's thrilling. It's also full of hope, because whatever has to happen hasn't happened yet." Domino has described 'One Breath' as a "bold and confident record that begins an exciting new chapter in this uniquely talented artist's career".

The trailer for One Breath, credited to longtime collaborator Emma Nathan, was released on 5 August 2013. The artwork for the album was created by photographer Roger Deckker.

Music Week awarded Calvi their Album of the Week for One Breath. The album was nominated for the 2014 Mercury Prize.

== Singles ==
The first single from One Breath, titled "Eliza", premiered on Monday 19 August 2013 on Lauren Laverne's BBC Radio 6 show at 11 am. The song was well received by This Is Fake DIY calling it "a cinematic strum of a lead track". It was officially released digitally and on vinyl on 1 October 2013 featuring the non-album track "A Kiss To Your Twin" as the B-side. The Special Edition LP also included a bonus 7" featuring two new songs: "Endless World" and "1970s Wind".

"Suddenly", the second single from One Breath (backed by Calvi's cover of Fire) was released on 7" vinyl and digitally on 23 December 2013.

The third single, "Piece by Piece" was released as a digital-only single on 31 March 2014 and featured no B-side.

== Track listing ==
All tracks are written by Anna Calvi.

No.	Title	Length
1.	"Suddenly"	3:34
2.	"Eliza"	3:38
3.	"Piece by Piece"	3:16
4.	"Cry"	2:54
5.	"Sing to Me"	4:01
6.	"Tristan"	2:42
7.	"One Breath"	4:43
8.	"Love of My Life"	3:06
9.	"Carry Me Over"	5:27
10.	"Bleed Into Me"	3:41
11.	"The Bridge"	2:08

== Personnel ==
- Anna Calvi – vocals (lead), guitar, vibraphone
- Mally Harpaz – marimba, vibraphone, harmonium, dulcimer
- Daniel Maiden-Wood – drums, vocals (backing), marimba, guitar percussion
- John Baggot - synths, organ, moog bass, piano, prepared piano
- Fiona Brice - string arrangements, conducting

== Charts ==
Chart (2013)	Peak position
Austrian Albums (Ö3 Austria)	69
Belgian Albums (Ultratop Flanders)	20
Belgian Albums (Ultratop Wallonia)	40
French Albums (SNEP)	33
German Albums (Offizielle Top 100)	79
Irish Albums (IRMA)	31
Irish Independent Albums (IRMA)	6
Italian Albums (FIMI)	39
Scottish Albums (OCC)	41
Swiss Albums (Schweizer Hitparade)	56
UK Albums (OCC)	32
UK Independent Albums (OCC)	8
US Heatseekers Albums (Billboard)	30
