= Anna Calvi =

British musician (born 1980)

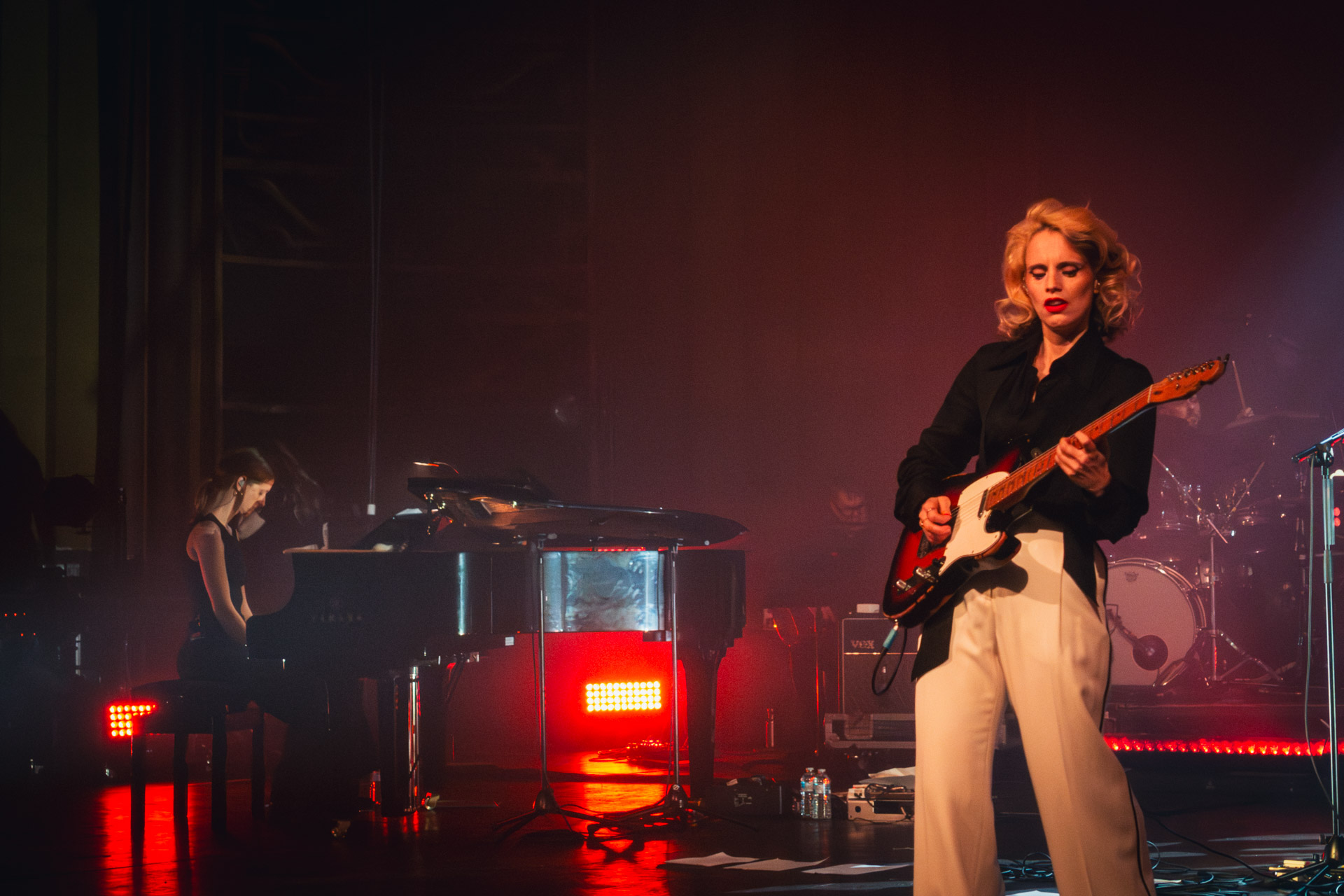
- Calvi performing in November 2025

Background information
- Born: Anna Margaret Michelle Calvi; 24 September 1980 (age 46); London, England
- Genres: Art rock; art pop; alternative rock; indie rock; indie pop; experimental rock
- Occupations: Singer; songwriter; musician
- Instruments: Vocals; guitar
- Years active: 2005–present
- Label: Domino
- Formerly of: Cheap Hotel
- Website: annacalvi.co.uk

Anna Margaret Michelle Calvi (born 24 September 1980) is an English singer-songwriter and guitarist. Her accolades include three Mercury Prize nominations, one Brit Award nomination, and a European Border Breakers Award. She has been noted by some critics as a virtuoso guitarist, as well as for her powerful, wide-ranging operatic contralto voice and sometimes androgynous stage appearance.

Born to therapist parents in London, Calvi graduated from the University of Southampton with a degree in music, having studied violin. She subsequently worked as a private guitar instructor before embarking on a music career. She released her eponymous debut album in 2011 through Domino Records to critical acclaim, earning a Mercury Prize nomination for Album of the Year, a British Breakthrough Act nomination at the 2012 Brit Awards and a European Border Breakers Award.

Her second album, One Breath, was released in 2013, earning her a second Mercury Prize nomination. She followed this in 2014 with the EP Strange Weather and subsequently wrote the music for a stage production of the opera The Sandman, directed by Robert Wilson. Calvi released her third full-length album, Hunter, in August 2018, earning her a third Mercury Prize nomination.

== Life and career ==
=== Early life (1980–2007) ===
Anna Margaret Michelle Calvi was born on 24 September 1980 in London, the younger of two children born to an English mother and Italian father, both therapists and "amateur musicians." Her sister Nuala Calvi is a journalist. Calvi spent most of the first three years of her life in a hospital undergoing treatment and surgeries to correct congenital hip dysplasia. "The way I dealt with that was to create my own world. And that's what my relationship with music is – a world of my own creation that I escape into. I was always a dreamer. The early things stick with you," she later remembered. Calvi grew up being exposed to a multitude of genres by her music-loving father; as well as her grandfather, with whom she spent summers in Rome. This eclectic array ranged from Captain Beefheart to The Rolling Stones to Maria Callas, combined with classical music: "I was so taken by the sound. Whenever I saw an instrument I would get so excited and my heart would beat really fast."

Calvi began playing violin at the age of six, before beginning to learn guitar at age eight. By the age of ten she was using a double cassette karaoke machine to overdub her guitar playing. She frequently played along to the records of Jimi Hendrix, whom she idolized. She also came to be much influenced by 20th century composers Messiaen, Ravel, and Debussy, attracted "to the impressionistic element of the music," and would try to recreate this feeling on the guitar.

When Calvi was 18 years old, she came out to her family as lesbian. After graduating from secondary school, Calvi enrolled at the University of Southampton, where she studied violin and guitar, graduating with a Bachelor of Arts degree in music in 2003. Following her completion of university, Calvi returned to London and worked as a guitar instructor, giving private lessons, though she reflected: "I was rubbish because I had taught myself so I couldn't explain how to play." She also worked as a sales assistant in a toy shop.

=== Early projects (2008–2010) ===
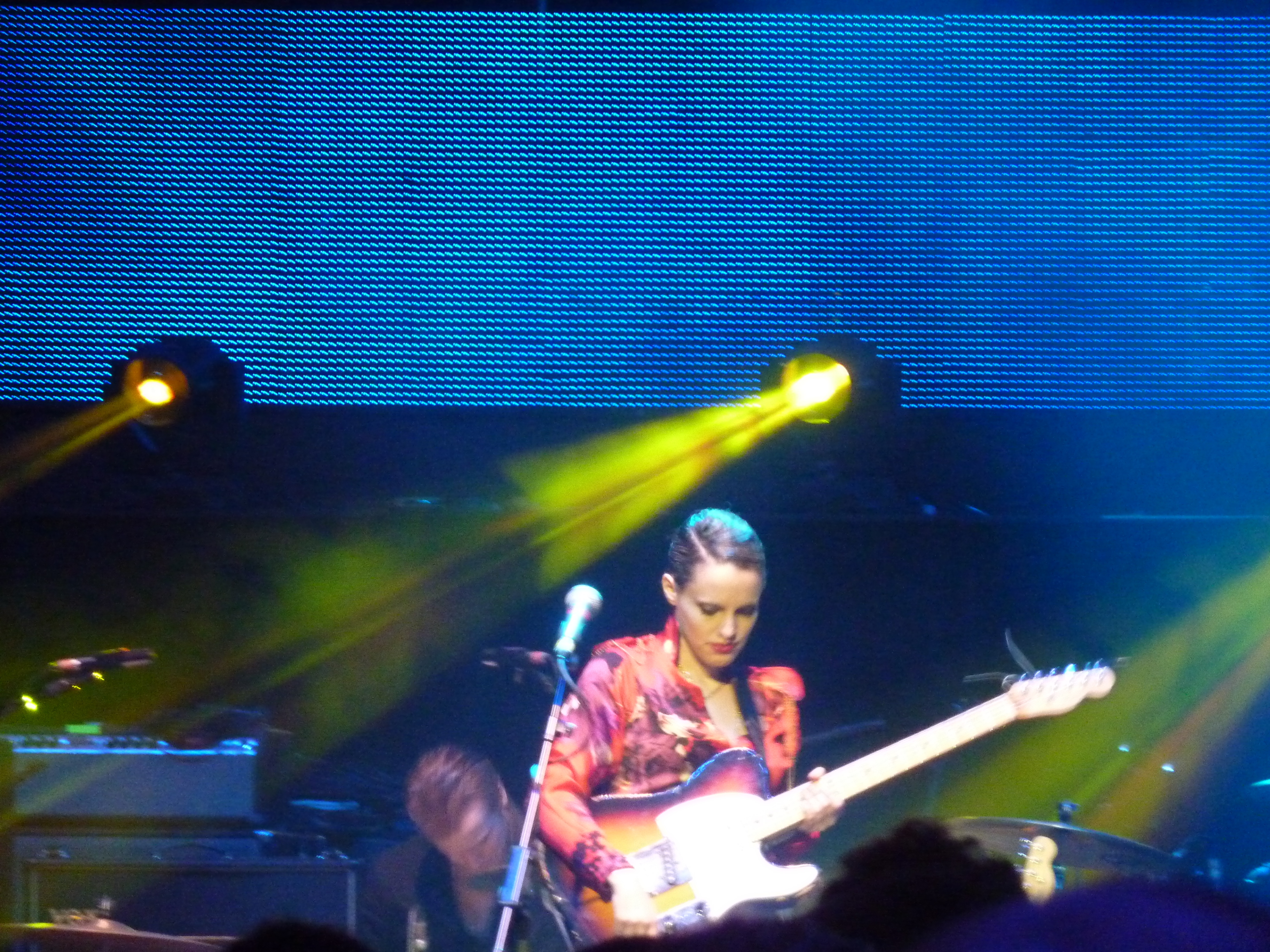
Calvi performing at the Royal Albert Hall, March 2010

Calvi did not begin singing until her mid-late-twenties. "I had a phobia about it until five years ago," she said in 2011. "I wouldn't sing in school or even in the shower. I had this emotional block about hearing my voice. So the guitar became my voice when I was a teenager, it was how I could express myself." In an effort to find her own voice, Calvi has spoken of how she would lock herself in a room for long periods of time, singing along to records by Edith Piaf and Nina Simone.

Calvi formed several bands, including Cheap Hotel, who released one download-only single ("New York"), which did not chart. Calvi later met multi-instrumentalist Mally Harpaz and drummer Daniel Maiden-Wood, who eventually formed her band. While playing in bands and giving guitar lessons, Calvi was privately recording songs on an eight-track recorder in the attic of her parents' home. At an early gig, Calvi caught the attention of Bill Ryder-Jones who urged Laurence Bell of Domino Records to sign her. Early support also came from Brian Eno, who heard about Calvi through a friend. Calvi played guitar on the track "The Prizefighter and the Heiress" on Johnny Flynn's album Been Listening, and in October 2009 she went on to support Flynn on tour. In December 2009, she signed a recording contract with Domino Records.

In the autumn of 2009 Calvi recorded a series of filmed Attic Sessions that were uploaded onto YouTube, including a cover of Leonard Cohen's "Joan of Arc", Elvis Presley's "Surrender", TV on the Radio's "Wolf Like Me" and David Bowie's "Sound & Vision". In 2010 Calvi supported American rock band Interpol on their United Kingdom tour, as well as label-mates the Arctic Monkeys at the Shepherd's Bush Empire. Nick Cave also invited her to support Grinderman across Europe in October 2010.

On 11 October 2010, Calvi released her debut solo single "Jezebel", a 1951 song originally written by Wayne Shanklin and made famous by Frankie Laine and French chanteuse Edith Piaf. Both "Jezebel" and the B-side "Moulinette" were recorded by Rob Ellis, and released on limited edition 7" and digital download. Live versions of both "Jezebel" and "Moulinette" were filmed at The Luminaire venue in London by Emma Nathan, who also created the vinyl artwork.

=== Debut album (2011–2012) ===
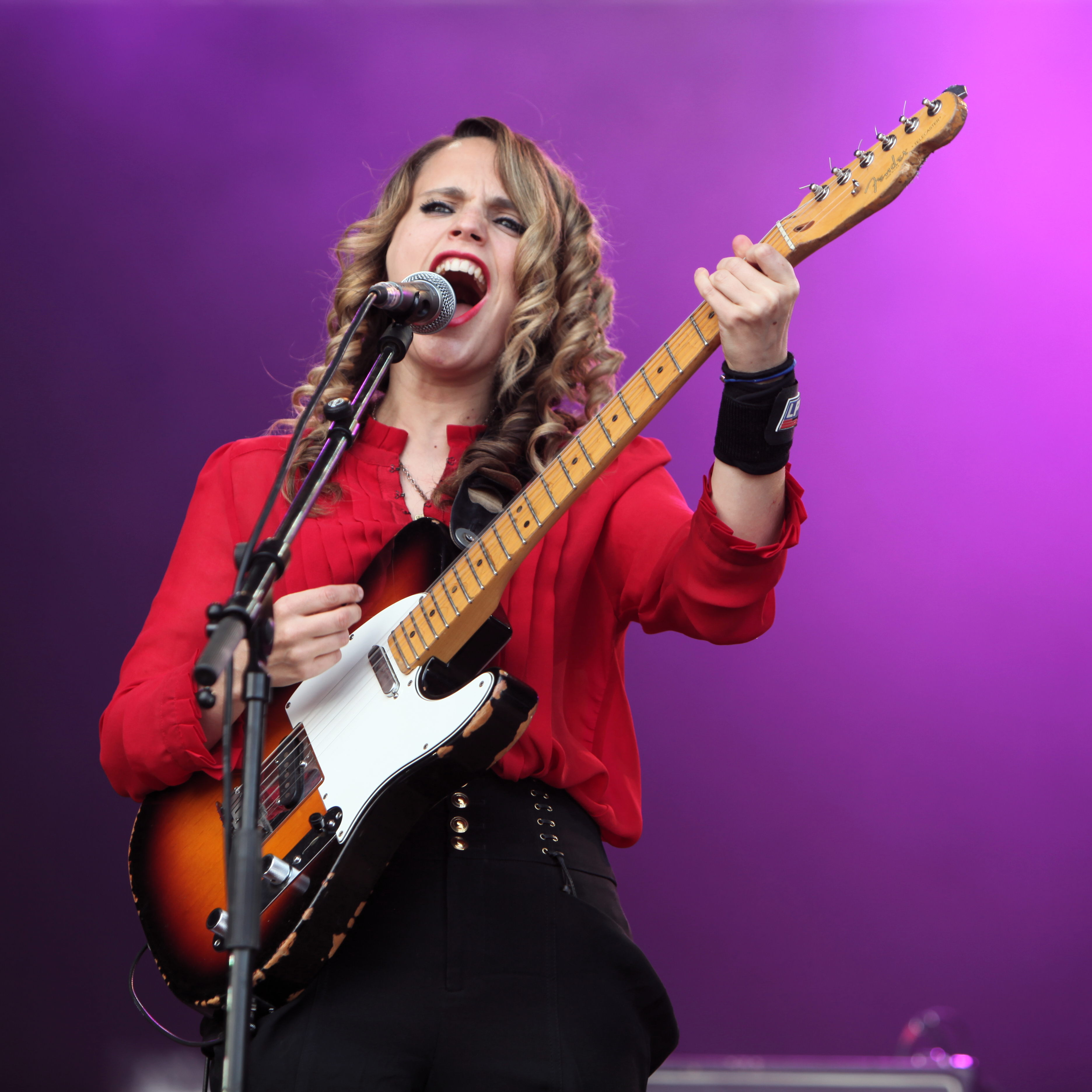
Anna Calvi at the Eurockéennes de Belfort live in July 2011

Calvi released her eponymous debut album in the UK and Europe through Domino Records on 17 January 2011, to critical acclaim. It entered the official UK charts at number 40, and achieved similar success across Europe, charting at 17 in France, 33 in Austria, 40 in Switzerland, 55 in Sweden and 70 in Germany. In France, according to Q magazine, Calvi "has become an overnight star, the album debuting in the Top 20." The album was released in USA, Australia, and Japan on 1 March 2011.

Calvi co-produced the album with long-term PJ Harvey collaborator Rob Ellis. Brian Eno sang backing vocals on Desire and Suzanne & I, Dave Okumu from the band The Invisible sang backing vocals on the song No More Words, and long-term collaborator Emma Nathan created the album artwork. "I see music quite visually and I like to create atmospheres... I like to try and create a whole world in the space of a song," explained Calvi. In an interview with The Daily Telegraph Calvi said of writing the album "'I imagine the different instruments as colours, and so it feels like painting. I need music to come from a really emotional place. With my music I do like to hypnotise people and take them somewhere else. I like to slowly draw people into a world."

NME gave the album 9 out of 10, describing it as "sumptuous, seductive and a bit scary, this velvety debut will stalk your dreams.", and stating that "this self-titled collection of 10 songs is perhaps the first great record of 2011." Uncut magazine said "This isn't just a great debut. It's a fearless rejection of current pop trends, fashioning a benchmark of intensity and originality that the rest of this year's albums will struggle to match.", whilst The Fly magazine called it an "arresting, sparse and darkly captivating listen." The Evening Standard said "the raw talent is undeniable: 2011 is Calvi's for the taking".

Calvi launched the album to sold-out show at the intimate Hoxton Hall in London on 27 January 2011. Calvi's European tour in late 2011 was filmed and released as a two-part series called Somewhere Along the Line.

The album was nominated for the Mercury Prize, which went instead to PJ Harvey. In January 2012, Calvi was awarded the European Border Breakers Award. Calvi was nominated in the Best British Breakthrough category at the BRIT Awards 2012.

In the summer of 2012, Calvi was one of the judges for the Mercury Music Prize.

Calvi took time off recording in November 2012 to sing on a Noah and The Whale song called "Heart of Nowhere", released in May 2013.

=== One Breath and other projects (2013–2017) ===
Calvi announced on 5 August 2013 that her second album titled One Breath was to be released on Domino Records on 7 October. Her announcement was accompanied by a trailer filmed by Emma Nathan. The record was produced by John Congleton and recorded in Blackbox Studios, France as well as Elmwood Recording Studios in Dallas, Texas, United States. Calvi has explained the title as: "One Breath is the moment before you've got to open yourself up, and it's about how terrifying that is. It's scary and it's thrilling. It's also full of hope, because whatever has to happen hasn't happened yet."

Calvi told Mojo magazine that whereas Anna Calvi was recorded on and off over three years, One Breath took just six weeks and was less of a challenge to complete than its predecessor. Calvi has said that she had been listening to composers John Adams and Steve Reich, as well as choral music, for inspiration while writing the record. Calvi talked to The Observer about One Breath saying: "I wanted to explore the feeling of being out of control, and how this can be very scary and yet thrilling at the same time. It's always important to me that the music tells the story as much as the lyrics, so I was very focused on creating rich textures and a lot of atmosphere for the songs to exist in. This record was made during quite a turbulent time in my life and I like the way I can feel that in the music when I listen back."

Released in October 2013, One Breath received critical praise upon release, with The Independent calling the album "an LP that rumbles with lusty insistence, swoons with bliss, luxuriates in cinematic style and nudges Calvi's emotive voice to fresh operatic heights". The album was nominated for the Mercury Prize, marking Calvi's second nomination. Two singles, "Eliza" and "Suddenly", were released in promotion of the album, both featuring videos directed by Emma Nathan.

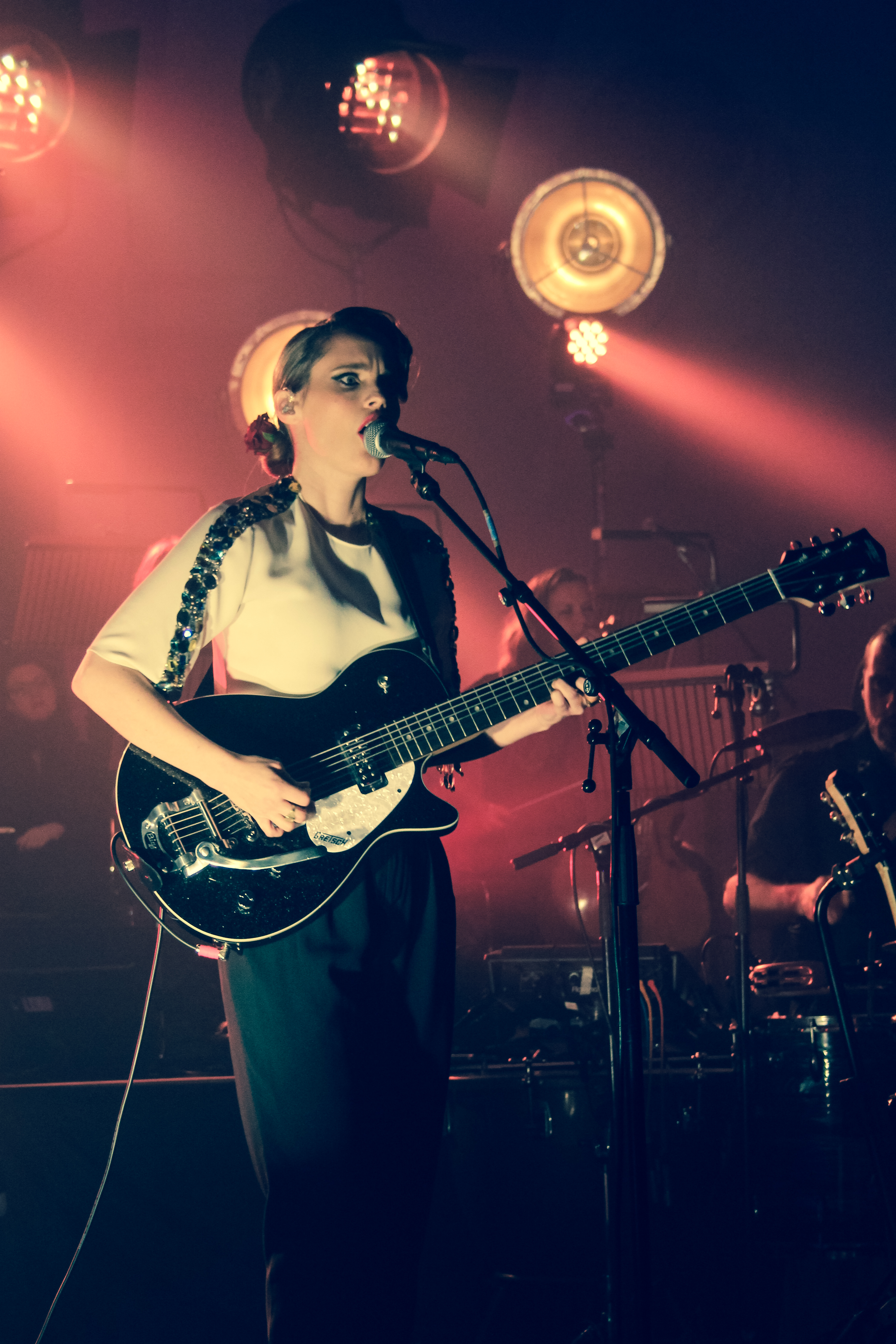
Calvi performing in London, 2014

Calvi began 2014 with a tour of the UK in February before heading to Europe throughout March. The Guardian gave Calvi's February performance at London's Troxy theatre a four star review, stating that it "confirm[ed] Calvi as a modern guitar hero of exceptional talent and imagination". After the show at the Troxy, Calvi played an intimate "solo show" to 150 fans at the George Tavern. Reviewing this special performance, Gigwise said that "up close and personal, the microscope highlights the nuances and flourishes that make Calvi the rarest of talent". On 24 March 2014, Calvi announced two shows in May in Sydney and Melbourne, as part of her Australian tour. She also performed on 1 June as a vocal guest alongside the Heritage Orchestra for their Giorgio Moroder tribute. Calvi returned to Glastonbury Festival on 28 June 2014 for a performance on the Park stage.

Calvi's first EP, a collection of covers titled Strange Weather, was released on 15 July 2014. The EP featured David Byrne (Talking Heads) and consisted of songs by Keren Ann, FKA Twigs, Connan Mockasin, Suicide, and David Bowie. Calvi also collaborated with Marianne Faithfull on her 2014 album track, "Falling Back". Subsequently, Calvi performed this track with Faithfull on the BBC's Later with Jools Holland TV show on 23 September 2014. She was then chosen to support Morrissey for his show at the O2 Arena in London on 29 November 2014.

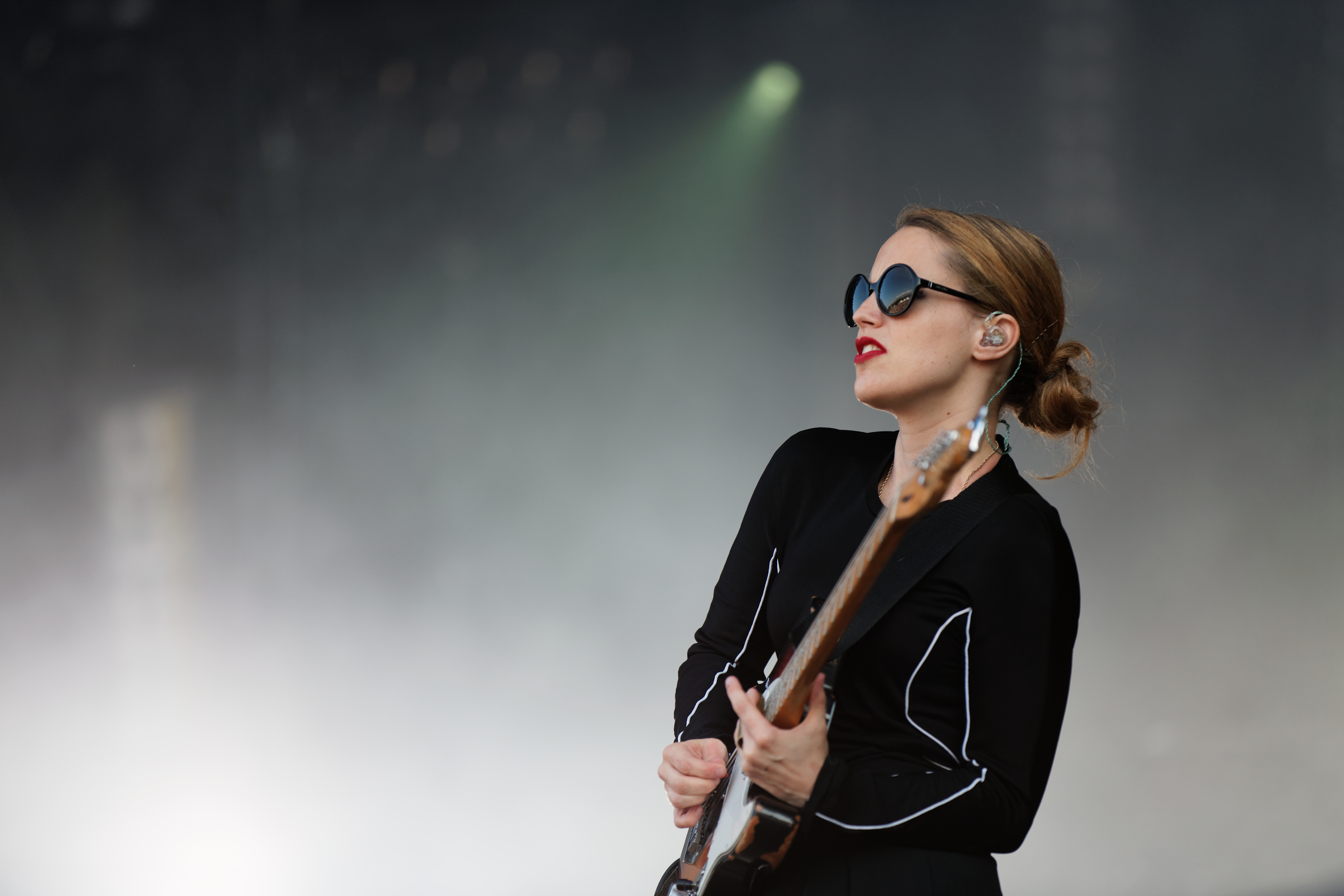
Calvi performing at Vieilles Charrues Festival, 2015

In December 2014, Calvi performed a one-off show with the innovative and eclectic Heritage Orchestra, conducted by Jules Buckley. New orchestral versions of tracks from her previous releases were performed at St John's Church in Hackney, London. The concert was a sold-out event which also saw guest appearances from Patrick Wolf and Charlie Fink from Noah and the Whale, and Dave Okumu producer and musician from the band Invisible. Calvi had also worked with the Heritage Orchestra previously on the Giorgio Moroder show at the Sydney Opera House.

On 3 March 2015 Calvi confirmed via her Facebook page that she would be recording a track for the 2015 science fiction film, The Divergent Series: Insurgent. Titled, "The Heart of You", it was written by Andrew Wyatt and produced by Adrian Utley (Portishead) at Real World Studios. The film's soundtrack was released on 17 March 2015 through Interscope Records and featured other artists including Woodkid, Lykke Li, M83, HAIM, Royal Blood, SOHN, Zella Day, and Imagine Dragons Calvi was once again a judge at the 2015 Mercury Music Prize.

On 4 February 2016, Calvi featured on Strung Out in Heaven, a David Bowie covers EP arranged by Jherek Bischoff and Amanda Palmer following the death of David Bowie on 10 January 2016. Calvi booked a studio in London on three days notice, contributing her voice and guitar to the track "Blackstar". The EP also features Neil Gaiman and John Cameron Mitchell. Subsequently, performing a moving rendition of "Blackstar" for the David Bowie tribute show at Radio City Music Hall in New York City.

In March 2016, Calvi was part of the Pieces of a Man: The Gil Scott-Heron Project, "a celebration of the life and legacy of the legendary American soul and jazz poet, musician, and author" in conjunction with Convergence Festival in London. Under the direction of The Invisible's Dave Okumu, an ensemble of guest vocalists and poets, including Andreya Triana, Kwabs and Jamie Woon performed reinterpretations of Scott-Heron's music. "Anna Calvi delivered a menacing rock-opera take on 'Me and the Devil'". In July 2016, Calvi and Jherek Bischoff performed "Lady Grinning Soul" at the BBC Proms David Bowie special.

In 2017, Calvi announced that she had written the music for an opera, The Sandman, based on the short story by E. T. A. Hoffmann, and directed by Robert Wilson. The play premiered on 3 May at the Ruhrfestspiele Festival, Recklinghausen, Germany and ran there until 9 May, after which it transferred to the Schauspielhaus in Düsseldorf.

=== Hunter (2018) ===
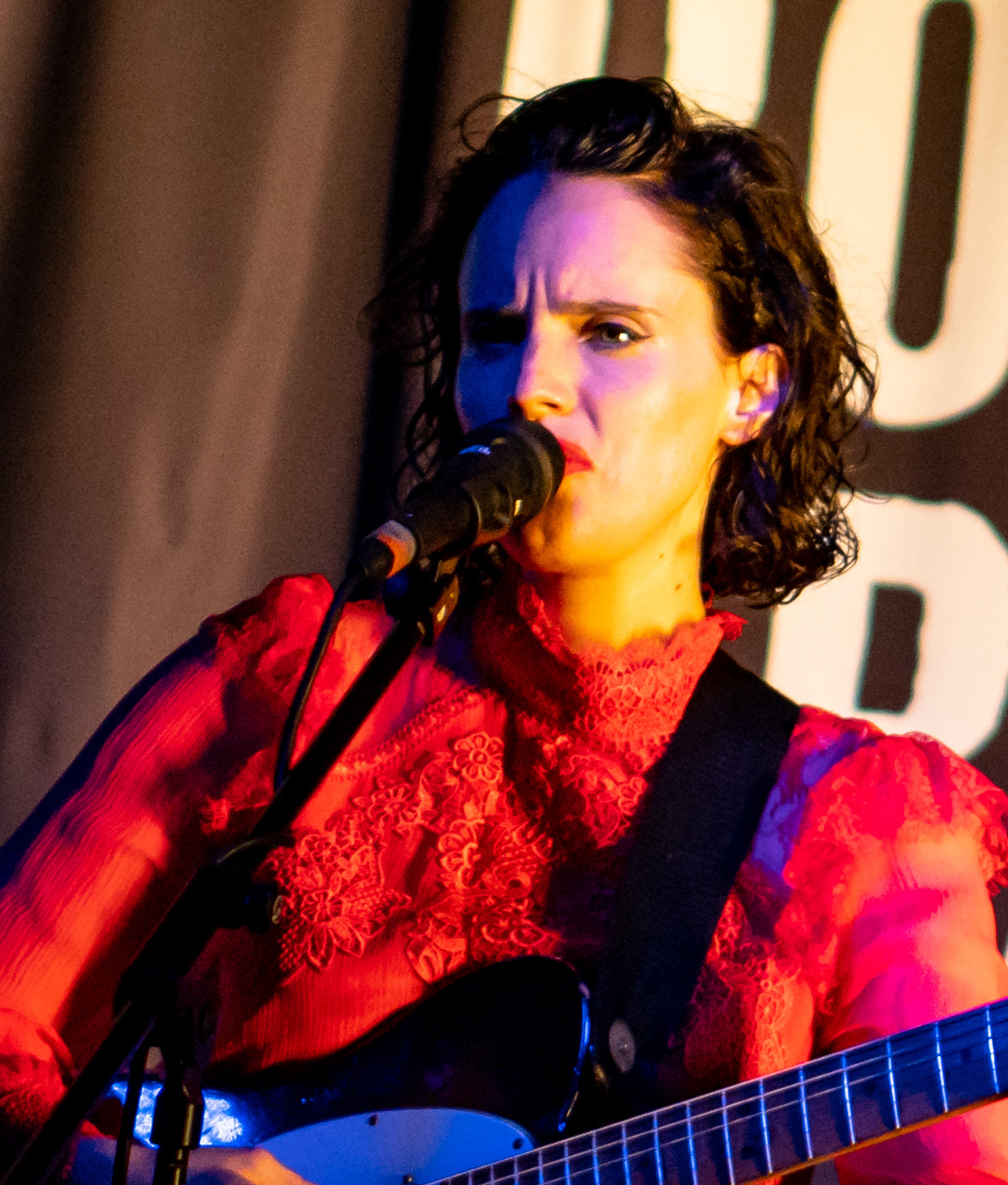
Calvi performing in New York City, 2018

While Calvi had revealed little about her personal life in her early career, in February 2018, she posted a photo with her girlfriend on her Instagram account. "It wasn't like, 'And now I'm going to come out [as a lesbian]'," Calvi said. "I think everyone who follows me knew anyway. I think my music has always been queer, and the people who needed that from me recognised it immediately. Those who didn't need that in their lives didn't notice."

In the summer of 2018, Calvi played three performances at Berghain in Berlin on 12 June, Paris La Gaîté Lyrique on the 15th, and the Heaven venue in London on 19 June. In early June 2018, Calvi announced that her third studio album, Hunter would be released by Domino Records on 31 August 2018. The album was co-produced by Nick Launay, and features Adrian Utley from Portishead and Martyn P. Casey from the Bad Seeds. At the same time she released a single, "Don't Beat the Girl Out of My Boy", and announced a European tour in support.

Hunter was received well by critics, earning a five star review in The Guardian, who deemed it "glorious and triumphant", and "a record that succeeds on any terms you try to force upon it," while Pitchfork Media rated it 7.8 out of 10 and praise Calvi's "remarkable evolution" which "pushes her artistry to another level". Calvi enlisted director Matt Lambert to produce the video for title track "Hunter". Dazed labelled it "an exploration of queer intimacy and self-love."

On 8 February 2019, Calvi performed her biggest headline performance at Roundhouse in London; the show received a 5 star review in The Telegraph, who called the performance "a one-woman, non-stop erotic cabaret." On 25 July 2019 it was revealed that Calvi had received a Mercury Award nomination for Hunter, her third nomination for the prize.

=== Peaky Blinders and other projects (2019) ===
Calvi is the composer for the musical score for the fifth season of the TV series Peaky Blinders, the first episode of which premiered on 25 August 2019. She told NME that "It was incredible for it not to be about me and to really try and get into another character. When I was doing it, I really felt like I was him. I really got into the mindset of Tommy Shelby."

In an interview with Headliner Magazine, Calvi said that she feels like a true 'Peaky' artist: "The songs in the show work really well – there is music that feels 'Peaky,' and I think I am one of those artists that is a Peaky artist. It's a bit like playing music with someone, where you're watching [Cillian Murphy's] performance and responding to it; it felt like a dialogue between us. For Tommy it is very much about trying to express his inner world...to underpin that idea that he may be saying one thing, but inside there's a turmoil and an anxiety in him which he is trying to hide – that was an important one."

Headliner Magazine praised Calvi's work on the Peaky Blinders score: "As source material, season five has given Calvi a lot to play with. Complicated narratives, quotable one-liners, and cunning plans that would put Baldrick to shame play out against a smorgasbord of ostentatious '20s glamour and opulence. The gang are out of their depth in high society, trying to pass themselves off as upstanding members of the community, however, the inevitable pull of violence, power struggles, turf-wars and revenge are never far from their minds. 'We all try and get away, but we never do,' warns the gravel-voiced head of the family, Polly.' Often using high levels of reverb, the score is all woozy electric guitars, dissonant chords and distorted riffs – and full on rock and roll – heightening the sense of unease and conflict amongst the characters. Key score moments include a beautiful melody juxtaposing a particularly violent (even for him) Arthur Shelby beatdown, and a tense assassination attempt where the guitar is strung out like the viewers' nerves."

Calvi wrote the song 'Julie' for the soundtrack of The Souvenir, a drama film directed by Joanna Hogg starring Tilda Swinton and Honor Swinton Byrne.

Calvi featured on Jeff Goldblum's second album I Shouldn't Be Telling You This in a mash-up of Wes Montgomery's "Four on Six" and Marianne Faithfull's "Broken English". She featured on the album, released in 2019, alongside Sharon Van Etten, Fiona Apple, Inara George and Gina Saputo.

2022 saw Anna Calvi score the long-awaited sixth and final season of Peaky Blinders alongside producer Nick Launay. The record-breaking sixth-season premiere marked the show's most viewed opening episode so far.

=== Hunted (2020) ===
In March 2020 Anna Calvi released Hunted, an album of reworks of the tracks from her 2018 album Hunter. The project featured artists such as Joe Talbot from Idles, Courtney Barnett, Julia Holter and Charlotte Gainsbourg.

=== Tommy EP (2022) ===
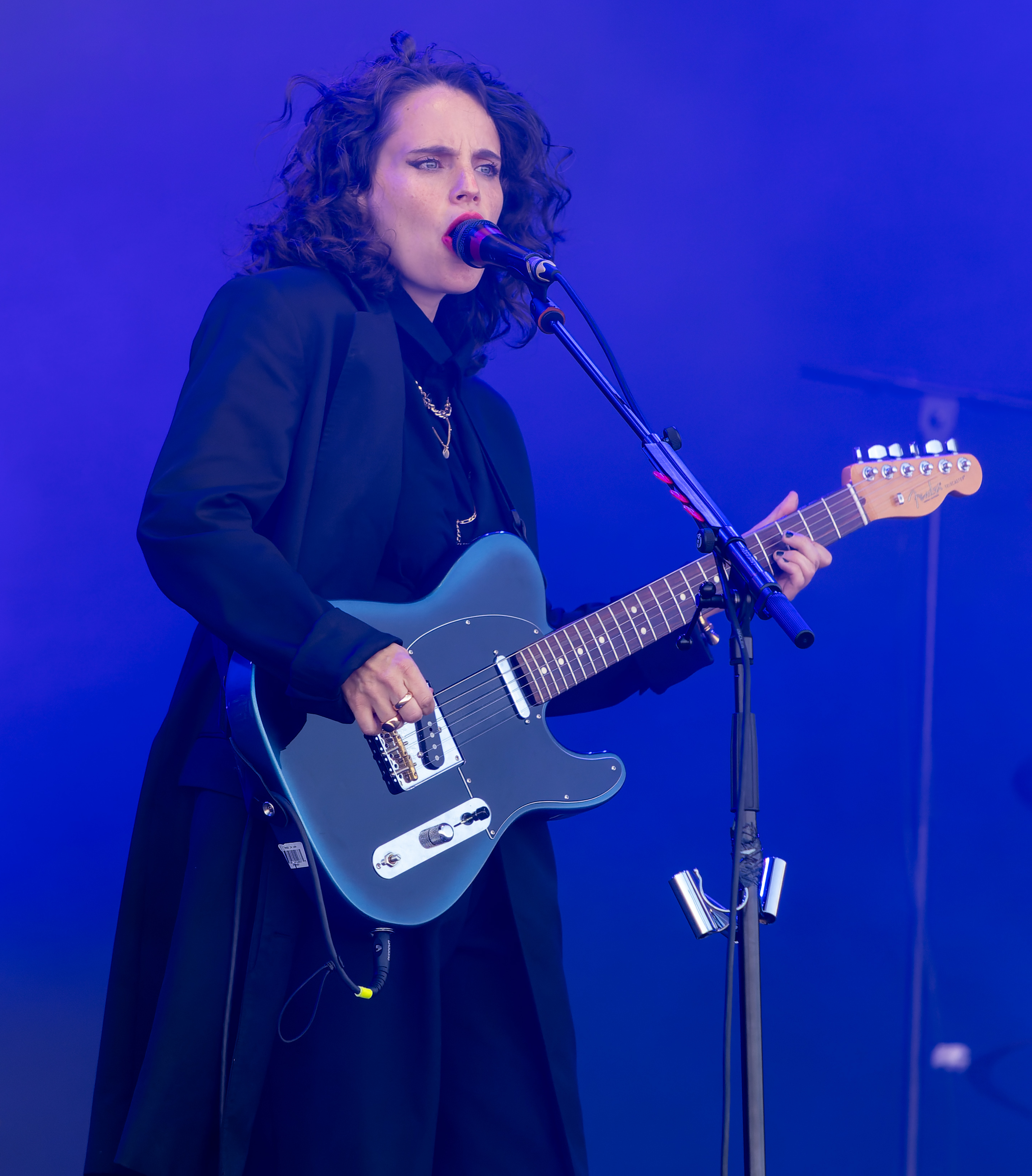
Calvi performing in June 2022

In May 2022, following the release of the sixth season of Peaky Blinders, Calvi released the Tommy EP - a collection of songs inspired by the shows lead character Tommy Shelby. It featured covers of Nick Cave's Red Right Hand and Bob Dylan's All the Tired Horses.

== Artistry ==
=== Musical style ===
"Rider to the Sea"
Sample of "Rider to the Sea" from Calvi's debut album, illustrating her sweeping guitar strumming technique and lead playing

Calvi has been referred to by two critics as a virtuoso guitarist. She has stated she aspires to create orchestral soundscapes with the guitar, and is noted for her particular style of playing which involves hitting the strings in a circular motion, rather than strumming up and down. The result has been described by Q as "the prodigious wash of sound that recall Ennio Morricone, Duane Eddy, even Jimi Hendrix in its fluidity."

Calvi has been compared to other female singers such as PJ Harvey and Siouxsie Sioux, and is noted for her powerful operatic voice. Her musical style has been described as dark, romantic, atmospheric pop, and she often uses high levels of reverb while playing guitar. The singer has said that the powers of lust are an inspiration, and her performances are deliberately sexually charged.

=== Influences ===
Calvi has cited Nina Simone, Maria Callas, the rock of Jimi Hendrix, The Smiths and the Rolling Stones, the blues of Captain Beefheart, the stage performances of David Bowie, Nick Cave, and Scott Walker as well as classical composers Messiaen, Ravel and Debussy as among her influences.

Calvi has also spoken of the influence of the films of Gus Van Sant, Wong Kar-Wai and David Lynch on her music. She admires "people that make beautiful films where the cinematography tells the story", and tries to do the same in her own work.

=== Equipment ===
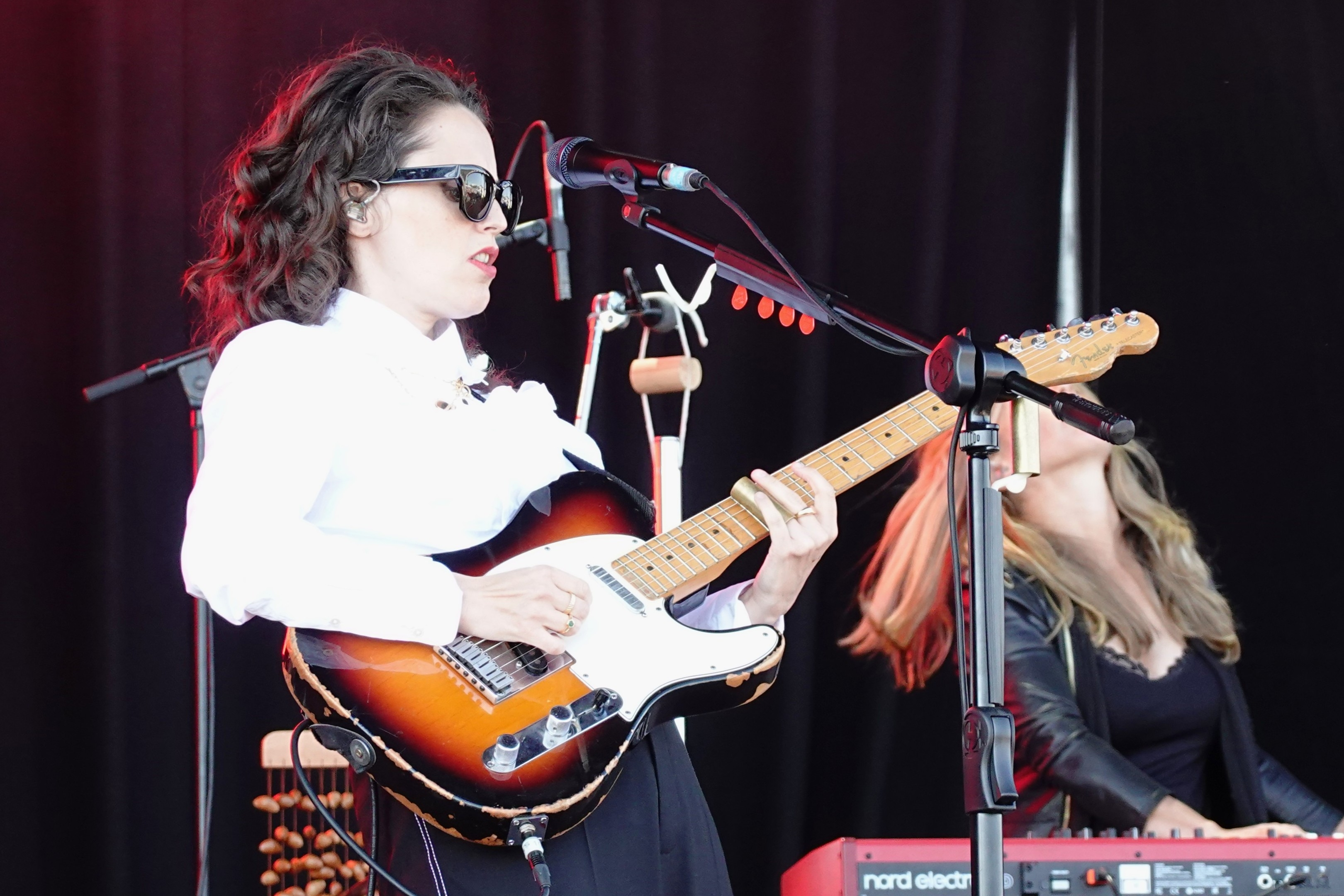
Calvi playing her favorite 1990s Sunburst Fender Telecaster, nicknamed "Autumn", at the Victorious Festival, Portsmouth, UK, in September 2022.

Calvi frequently uses a 1990s American-made Fender Telecaster guitar and a vintage red Vox AC30 amp, both live and in the studio.

Calvi uses several pedal boards with a variety of effects pedals including but not limited to:- Crowther Hotcake overdrive, EarthQuaker Dispatch Master delay, Electro-Harmonics (Holy Grail, POG-2, Freeze & Superego), GuitarTech Analog Delay, Ibanez Tube Screamer overdrive, Mesa Tone-Burst boost, T-Rex Room Mate reverb and Walrus-Audio Slö reverb.

== Public image ==
Visually, Calvi nods to the world of flamenco in her stage outfits, opting for the high trousers and blouse of a male dancer rather than the traditional frilled dress.

On 1 December 2010 Calvi performed at the Colette showcase in Paris as part of The Room of Curiosities exhibition by Thomas Erber.

Calvi was invited to play at the Gucci dinner which was hosted by Vogue during the 2011 Haute Couture Paris fashion week. Frida Giannini, creative director at Gucci, also chose outfits for Calvi to wear during her May 2011 US tour. Calvi opened the new Gucci Sydney store on 30 November 2011.

Calvi also performed at the Fendi auction in May 2014 at Sotheby's in London, and at the Chloe Paris F/W event on 28 September 2014.

The fashion designer Karl Lagerfeld said he was a fan of her music, and photographed Calvi for the Maison Michel Fall Winter 2011 lookbook.

Sir Paul Smith photographed Calvi for the cover of L'Express Styles.

Calvi was invited onto the Chanel table for the Amfar charity event at the 2011 Cannes Film Festival.

On 28 September 2014 Calvi accompanied Marianne Faithfull in a headline performance at the Chloé fashion show in Paris, France.

On 20 February 2017, Calvi performed four of her own tracks (including two new songs) and a cover of Christine and the Queens "iT" at the Burberry London Fashion Week show with strings and a choir from The Heritage Orchestra. All five tracks were released as the 'Live for Burberry' EP.

== Discography ==
=== Studio Albums ===
- Anna Calvi (Domino, 2011)
- One Breath (Domino, 2013)
- Hunter (Domino, 2018)
- Hunted (Domino, 2020)
- Peaky Blinders: Season 5 (Original Score) (Domino, 2024)
- Peaky Blinders: Season 6 (Original Score) (Domino, 2024)

=== Singles and EPs ===
- Jezebel (Domino, 2010)
- Moulinette (Domino, 2010)
- Blackout (Domino, 2011)
- Surrender (Domino, 2011)
- Desire (Domino, 2011)
- Joan Of Arc (Domino, 2011)
- Suzanne And I (Domino, 2011)
- Baby It's You (Domino, 2011)
- Jezebel (Version Française) (Domino, 2012)
- Wolf Like Me (Domino, 2012)
- Eliza (Domino, 2013)
- A Kiss To Your Twin (Domino, 2013)
- Suddenly (Domino, 2013)
- Fire (Domino, 2013)
- Strange Weather (Domino, 2013)
- Don't Beat the Girl out of My Boy (Domino, 2018)
- Hunter (Domino, 2018)
- As a Man (Domino, 2018)
- You're Not God (From 'Peaky Blinders' Original Soundtrack) (Domino, 2019)
- Aint No Grave (Domino, 2022)
- Tommy (Domino, 2022)
- Black Tuesday (Domino, 2023)
- Miquelon (Domino, 2024)
- I See A Darkness (Domino, 2025)
- God's Lonely Man (Domino, 2025)
- Is This All There Is? (Domino, 2026)
- Don't Fall Asleep (Universal-Island Records Ltd., 2026)

==== Live Singles and EPs ====
- Anna Calvi Live at KCRW (Domino, 2011)
- Live for Burberry (Domino, 2017)
- Hunter (Live at The Roundhouse) (Domino, 2022)

== Accolades ==
Year	Organisation	Nominated work	Award	Result
2010	BBC Sound of 2011	Anna Calvi	Sound of 2011	Nominated
2010	Rober Awards Music Poll	Anna Calvi	Most Promising New Artist	Nominated
2011	UK Festival Awards	Anna Calvi	Best Breakthrough Artist	Nominated
2011	European Festivals Awards	Anna Calvi	Newcomer of The Year	Nominated
2011	Mercury Prize	Anna Calvi	Album of the Year	Nominated
2012	Eurosonic Noorderslag	Anna Calvi	European Border Breakers Award (UK)	Won
2012	The Guardian	Anna Calvi	First Album Award	Nominated
2012	Brit Awards	Anna Calvi	British Breakthrough Act	Nominated
2012	European Festivals Awards	Anna Calvi	Newcomer of The Year	Nominated
2012	Music Producers Guild Awards	"Desire"	UK Single of the Year	Nominated
2014	AIM Independent Music Award	One Breath	Best 'Difficult' Second Album	Nominated
2014	Mercury Prize	One Breath	Album of the Year	Nominated
2014	Rober Awards Music Poll	"Strange Weather" (with David Byrne)	Best Cover Version	Won
2018	Q Awards	Hunter	Best Album	Nominated
2018	Soundcheck Award	Hunter	Album of the Year	Won
2019	GAFFA Awards (Sweden)	Hunter	Best International Album	Nominated
2019	Music Producers Guild Awards	"Don't Beat The Girl Out of My Boy"	UK Single Song Release of the Year	Won
2019	GAFFA Awards	"As a Man"	Best International Hit	Nominated
2019	Mercury Prize	"Hunter"	Album of the Year	Nominated
2019	Rolling Stone International Music Award	"Hunter"	Album of the Year	Won
2019	Q Awards	Fender Play Award	Fender Play Award	Won
