= Maurice Besly =

English composer, conductor and organist

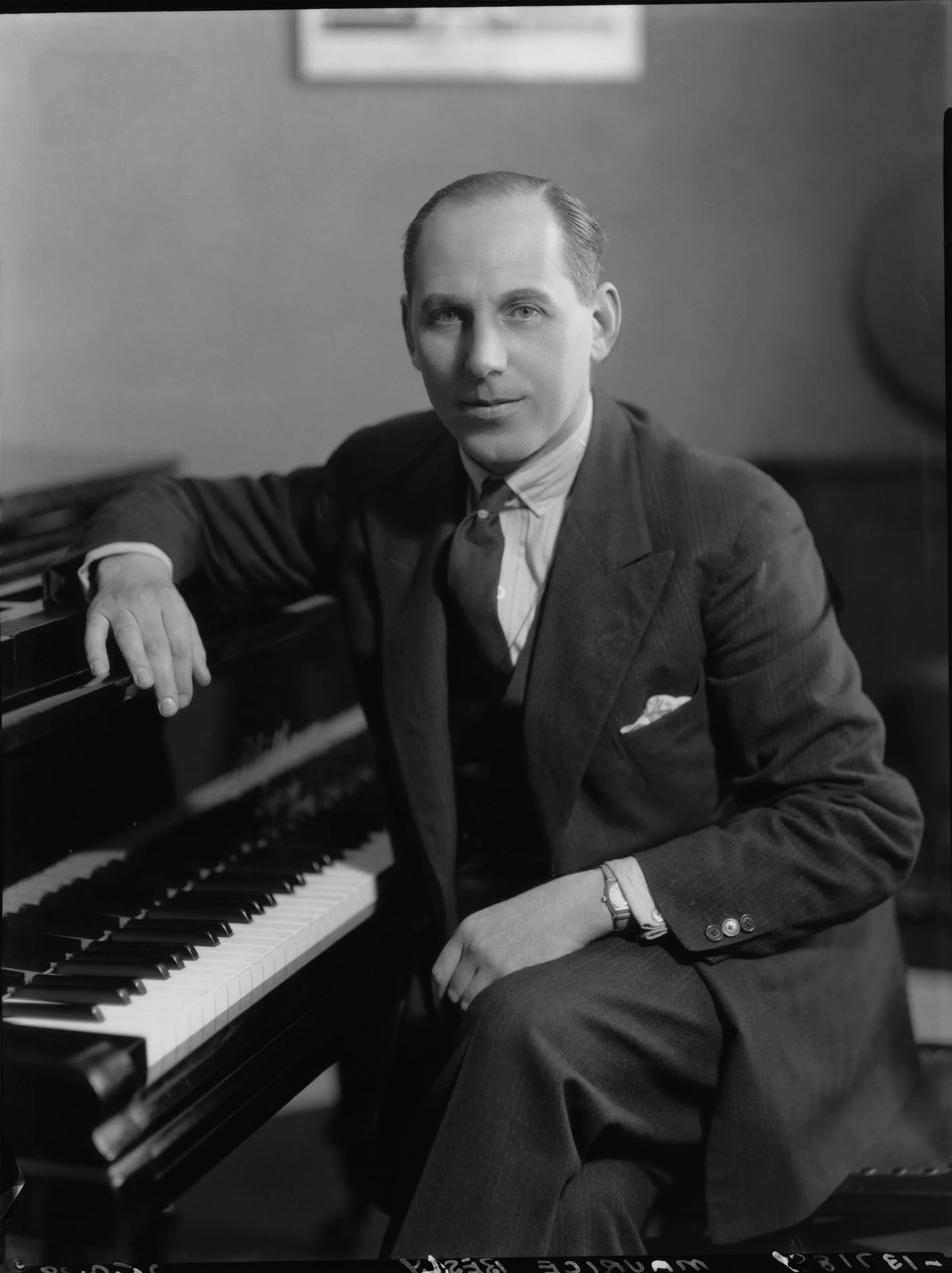
Besly in 1928

Edward Maurice Besly (1888–1945) was an English composer, conductor, schoolteacher, organist, and arranger best known for his popular ballads, The Second Minuet and Time, You Old Gipsy Man. More ambitious vocal pieces were the Four Poems Op 24, Charivaria (5 songs), and his setting of Christina Rossetti's The shepherds had an angel for soprano solo and chorus.

Besly was born in Normanby, Yorkshire, and was educated at Tonbridge School and Caius College, Cambridge. After a short stage career he studied music at the Leipzig Conservatorium under Teichmüller, Schreck, and Krehl. From 1912 to 1914 he was a music-master at Tonbridge School, returning there after World War I as Assistant Music Master. In 1919 he became director of music and organist of Queen’s College, Oxford (1919–1926), and subsequently took over the Oxford Orchestral Society from Sir Hugh Allen. He gave his first concert in London with the London Symphony Orchestra in 1923, and conducted the Royal Albert Hall Orchestra, and the Scottish Orchestra for a portion of the season in 1924. He was sometime Director of the Performing Rights Society. In his latter years he worked in legal practice as a solicitor and notary public.

Besly's compositions include orchestral works, songs and ballads, short choral works, piano pieces, and works for violin. He also composed the musical plays For Ever After, Luana and Khan Zala and edited the Queen’s College Hymn Book. His transcriptions for orchestra include works by Bach, and for piano / organ works by Stravinsky (Firebird suite), Falla (El amor brujo) and Bizet (Carmen). His motet O Lord, support us, a setting of a prayer by St John Henry Newman, is still frequently sung in Anglican Cathedrals.

From time to time his name is misspelt as "Besley" rather than "Besly".
