= Oxford University Jazz Orchestra =

UK musical group

Logo of the Oxford University Jazz Orchestra

The Oxford University Jazz Orchestra (OUJO, Japanese: アウジョー) is a jazz orchestra based in the University of Oxford, England. It was founded by students in 1992, initially as a word-of-mouth, unauditioned group, later developing into a full-fledged, professional standard big band. Notable alumni from the band include Canadian jazz vocalist Diane Nalini, trumpeter and NYJO musical director Mark Armstrong, London-based trombonist Callum Au, saxophonists Carlos Lopez-Real and Idris Rahman, and ENO conductor Stephen Higgins.

== History ==
OUJO has been a multiple-time winner at the BBC Radio 2 National Big Band Competition, and has performed at the Oeuf de Jazz Festival in Le Mans, the OK! Celebrity Ball in London, and the Bull's Head jazz venue in Barnes, west London.

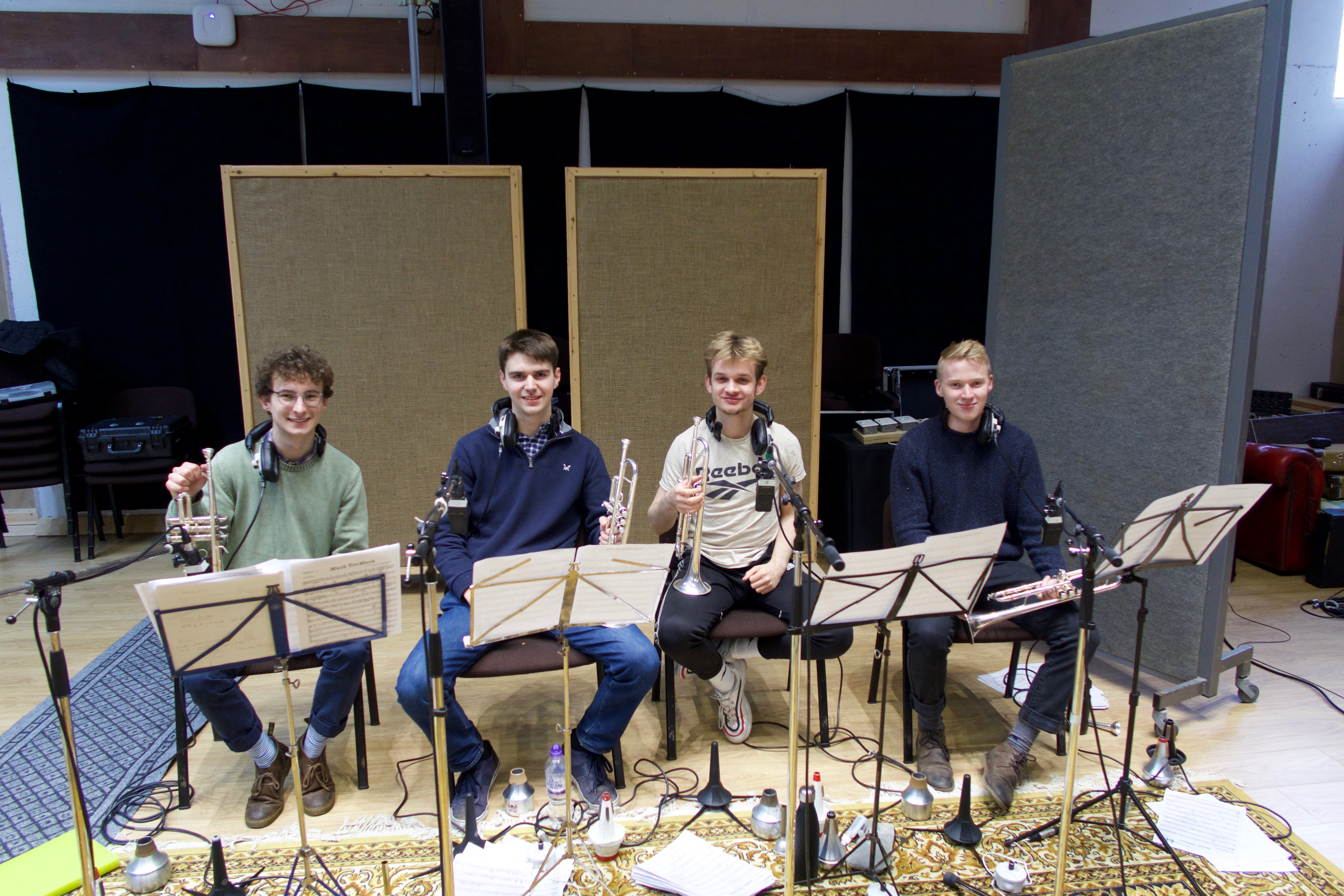
OUJO trumpet players at Challow Park Studios in March 2019

From 1999 to 2002, the band was led by cardiologist and saxophonist Euan Ashley. During his tenure, the band appeared at the Glasgow International Jazz Festival and performed Kenny Wheeler's Sweet Time Suite at St Barnabas Church, Oxford. In 2002, OUJO recorded the live LP Know Where You Are.

In 2010, OUJO toured New York City, performing at multiple venues including a performance for the Hudson Union Society at the Russian Tea Room and as part of the "After Work" series in Bryant Park.

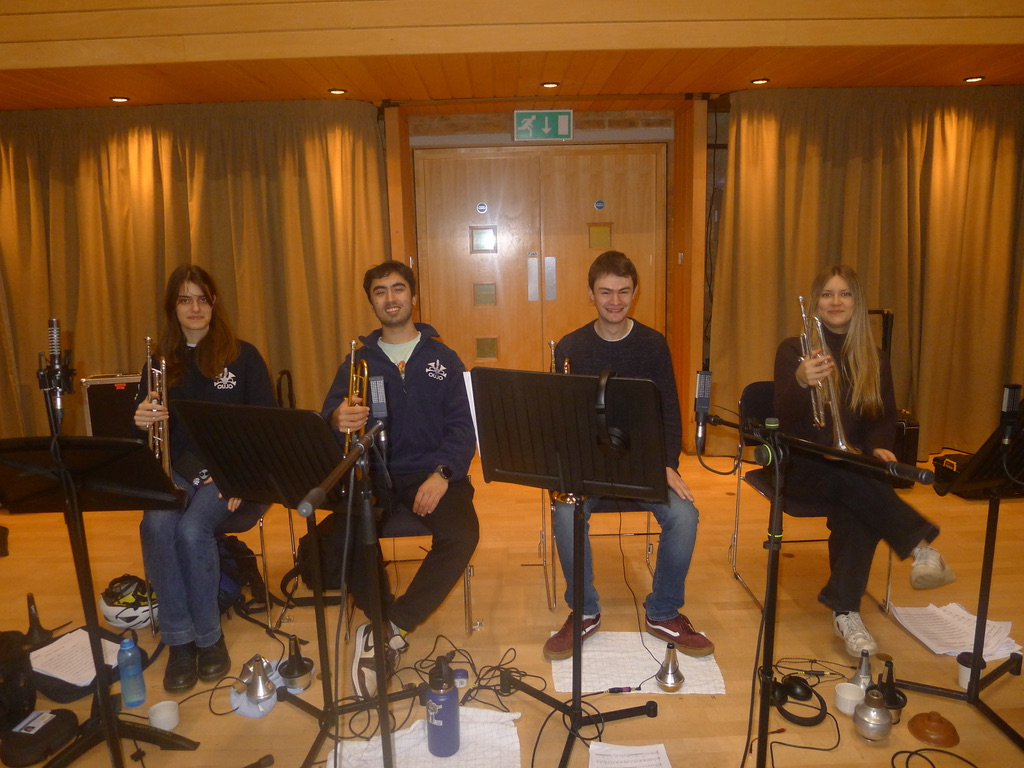
OUJO trumpet players recording at the JDP in March 2025.

In 2012, the band toured to Canada, performing at the Toronto Downtown Jazz Festival, supporting the Mingus Big Band on the main stage at the Ottawa International Jazz Festival, and playing at the Montreal International Jazz Festival. In 2013, OUJO became an official Oxford University Music Society affiliated ensemble.

In 2015, OUJO performed Duke Ellington's choral composition The Sacred Concerts, in collaboration with Schola Cantorum of Oxford, saxophonist Nigel Hitchcock, and vocalist Tina May, and tap dancer Annette Walker at the Sheldonian Theatre.

In 2016, the orchestra travelled to New York City once again. As well as being invited back to the Hudson Union Society, the band also performed at the Cornell Club of New York and at ShapeShifter Lab in Brooklyn on Independence Day.

In 2018, OUJO made its first tour to Asia, travelling to Bangkok, Thailand. In 2025 OUJO ventured on tour to the island of Ischia, giving a concert at Giardini La Mortella, the former private home of British composer and University of Oxford alumnus William Walton. September 2026 saw the band embark on a two-week tour of Japan, which included performances with force-majeur trumpeter Eric Miyashiro and several student big bands from the Tokyo and Kansai regions.

== Associated Ensembles ==
The Oxford University Jazz Orchestra was linked with the Oxford University Big Band (OUBB), another jazz orchestra based in Oxford. The group was based on a band formed in 1961 by NYJO founder Bill Ashton.

== Present Activity ==
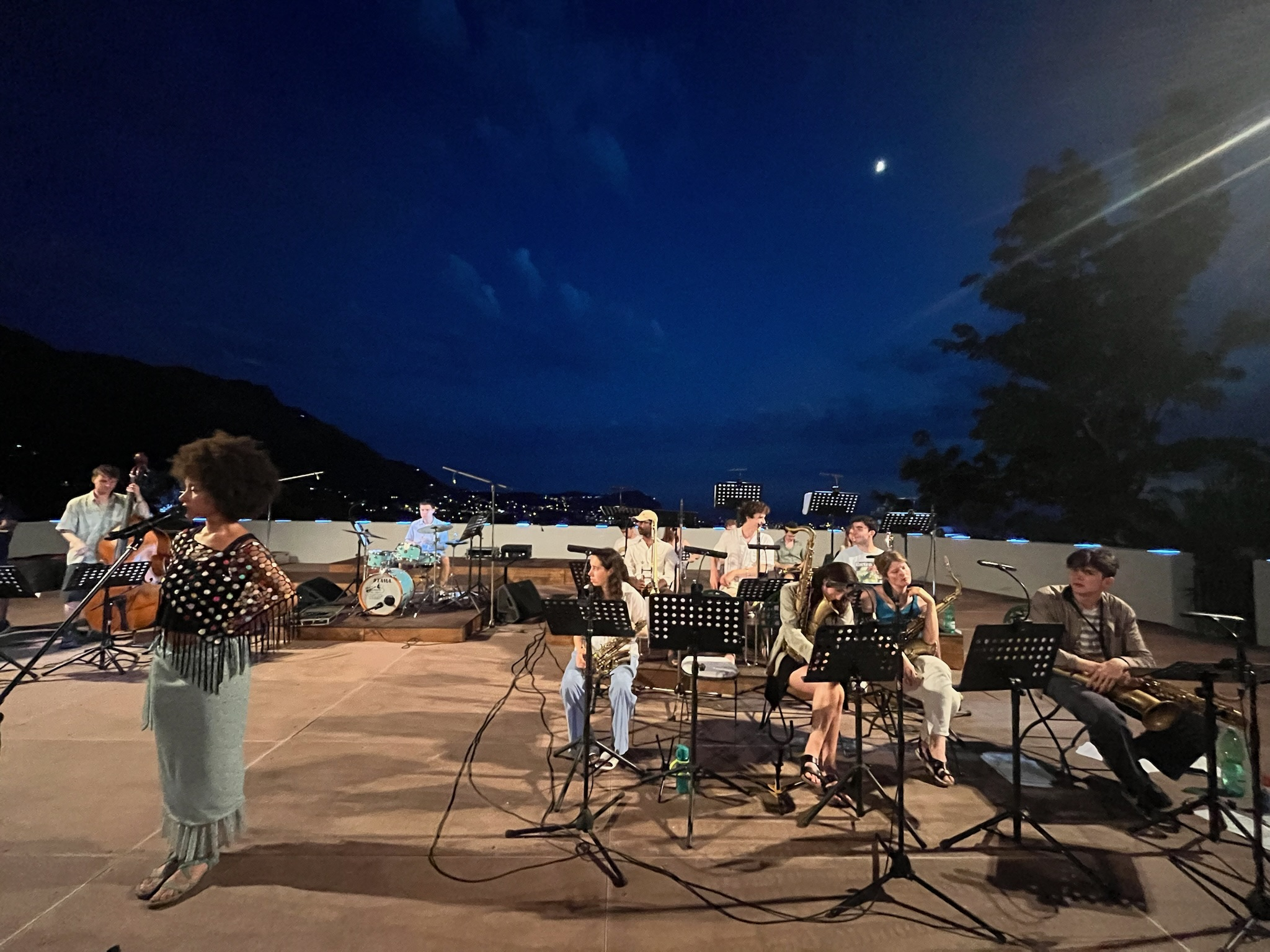
OUJO warming up in Ischia, Italy

OUJO performs regularly on the Oxford ball circuit, including at the Commemoration balls, having appeared in line-ups with artists such as The Streets, Sophie Ellis-Bextor, Natty, and Athlete. The band represents Oxford annually in a Varsity ‘Jazz Off’ match against ensembles from the University of Cambridge and Durham University.

In 2018, the ensemble performed the European premiere of the Jazz at Lincoln Center Orchestra's Big Band arrangement of John Coltrane's A Love Supreme at the Sheldonian Theatre. The performance featured OUJO alumnus, Mark Armstrong.

2024 marked the start of a collaboration with Gwilym Simcock, with the band performing a number of world premieres during two back-to-back concerts. This returned in 2025 with a concert described in turns as "languid", "restless", and "tight".

== Band Members ==
Current members of OUJO as of March 2026:

Alto 1	Fraser Hauser, Fraser Hauser
Alto 2	Hugh Pagel/Will Bowman
Tenor 1	Eva Fidler (Musical Director)
Tenor 2	Ben Dakshy
Baritone	Hoyeon Chang
Trombone 1	James Thistlewood
Trombone 2	Sheen Bendon
Trombone 3	Joel Beazly
Trombone 4	Charlie Bach
Trumpet 1	James 'TWM' McQueen
Trumpet 2	Guy Barwell
Trumpet 3	Peter Abeyawardene
Trumpet 4	Sophie Simpson
Piano	Alexander McNamee
Bass	Adam Cole
Drums	Ross Baker
Vocal 1	Phoebe Holmes-Simeon (President)
Vocal 2	Sofia Hoad

== See also ==
- Oxford University Jazz Society
