= London Sessions =

London Session(s) or The London Session(s) may refer to:

== Music ==
- The London Session Orchestra, under leader Gavyn Wright

=== Albums ===
- The London Sessions (Mel Tormé album), a re-issue of Tormé: A New Album (1977)
- The London Sessions, by Georges Delerue Frank Fitzpatrick (1990)
- The London Sessions, recording sessions by The Blackeyed Susans, released as the EP ...Depends On What You Mean By Love (1991)
- The London Sessions, by Tim Rose (2004)
- The London Session, by Benjamin Herman (2006)
- London Sessions (LCD Soundsystem album) (2010)
- The London Session, by Bobby Worth (2011)
- The London Sessions (Mary J. Blige album) (2014)
- The London Session, by Umphrey's McGee (2015)
- The London Sessions (Tiësto album) (2020)

== See also ==
- The London Howlin' Wolf Sessions, by Howlin' Wolf (1971)
- Love God, Love People: The London Sessions, by Israel Houghton (2010)
