= Armenian State Symphony Orchestra =

Armentian national symphony orchestra

- Orchestra
- Former name: State Youth Orchestra of Armenia
- Founded: 2006
- Website: armsymphony.am

The Armenian State Symphony Orchestra (ASSO) is a symphony orchestra based in Yerevan, Armenia. It was founded in 2006 by conductor Sergey Smbatyan, who serves as its Artistic Director and Principal Conductor. The orchestra is recognized for its innovative concert programs and its active role in popularizing classical music among the younger generation in Armenia.

The orchestra performs more than 50 concerts annually both domestically and internationally. Its repertoire spans multiple genres and formats, including symphonic works, ballet, and opera, as well as cinematic scores and jazz interpretations of classical compositions. Alongside the standard classical canon, the orchestra regularly incorporates works by contemporary and emerging composers into its primary concert seasons.

The Armenian State Symphony Orchestra has collaborated with several contemporary composers, performing and premiering works by Krzysztof Penderecki, Sir Karl Jenkins, Giya Kancheli, and Tigran Mansuryan.

The ensemble has also performed under the direction of conductors such as Valery Gergiev and Vladimir Spivakov. Its concert history includes performances with soloists such as violinists Maxim Vengerov, Sergey Khachatryan, Vadim Repin, and Zakhar Bron, as well as pianists Denis Matsuev, Vahagn Papyan, and Boris Berezovsky. In 2019–20, the orchestra's artist-in-residence is the violinist Maxim Vengerov and their composer-in-residence is Alexey Shor.

In 2024, on the occasion of the 100th anniversary of French-Armenian singer, actor and composer Charles Aznavour, the Armenian State Symphony Orchestra released instrumental arrangements of his pieces for cello and orchestra with Deutsche Grammophon. These arrangements will be created in collaboration with French cellist Camille Thomas and music producer and sound engineer Chris Alder.

== History and activities ==
The Armenian State Symphony Orchestra was established in 2006 by Sergey Smbatyan, who continues to serve as its artistic director and principal conductor.

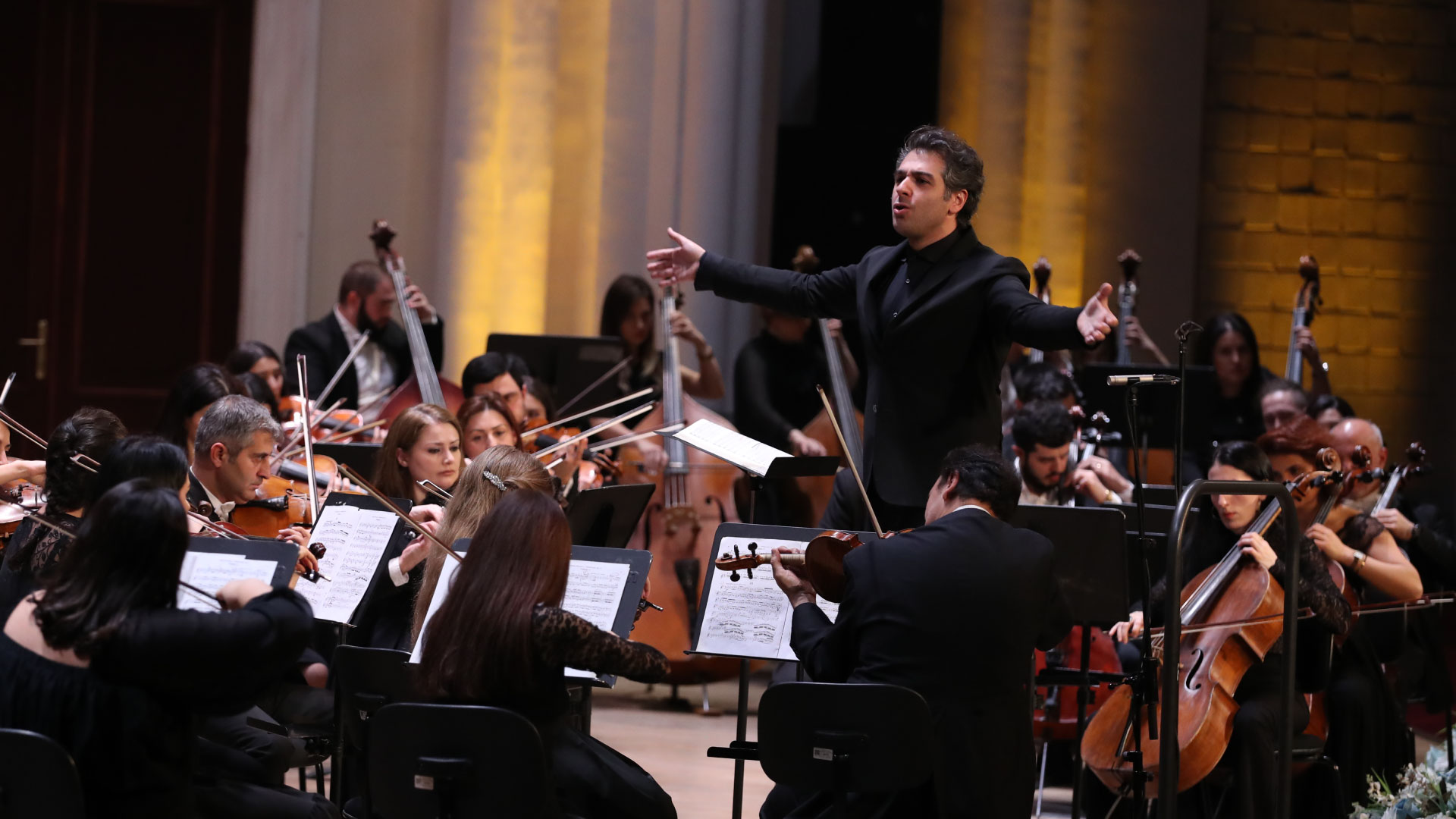
Sergey Smbatyan conducting the Armenian State Symphony Orchestra

The first concert of the orchestra was held on January 25, 2006.

Since its inception, the orchestra has focused on increasing cultural awareness and promoting classical music within Armenia.

In 2010, the orchestra founded the Armenian Composing Art Festival with the aim of promoting the music of Armenian composers of the 20th and 21st centuries. In 2011, the orchestra released its first album under Sony, entitled "Music is the Answer" which featured works by Tchaikovsky, Hayrapetyan and Shostakovich.

In 2013, the orchestra founded the Khachaturian International Festival․
