= Sergey Smbatyan =

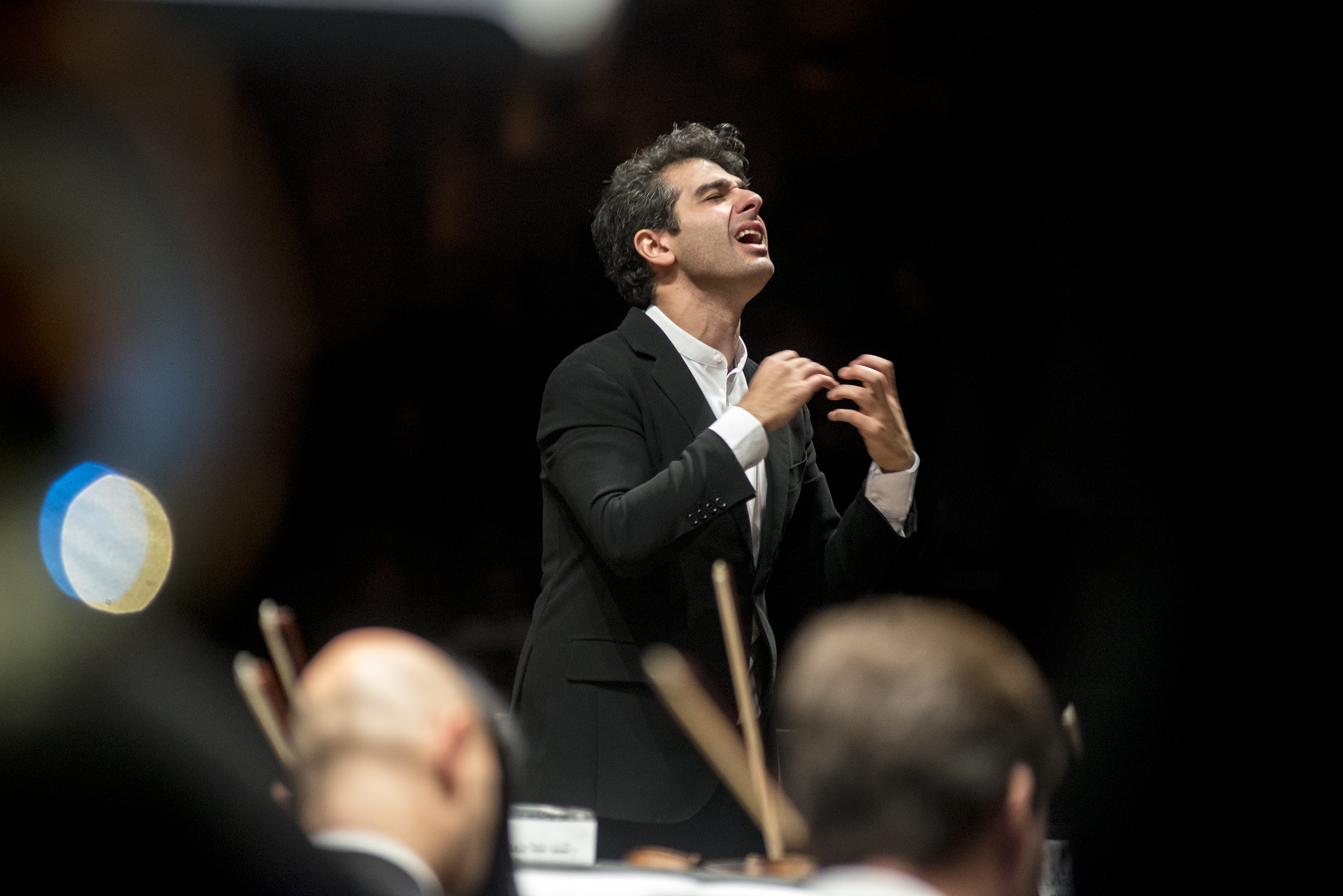
- Born: 23 September 1987 (age 38); Yerevan, Armenia
- Occupations: Conductor; Educator; Armenia UNICEF National Ambassador
- Years active: 2006 -
- Organizations: Armenian State Symphony Orchestra; Malta Philharmonic Orchestra
- Father: Armen Smbatian
- Website: https://sergeysmbatyan.com/

Sergey Smbatyan (born 23 September, 1987) is an Armenian conductor. He is the founding Artistic Director and Principal Conductor of the Armenian State Symphony Orchestra, and Principal Conductor at Malta Philharmonic Orchestra since 2019. He is also the Artistic Director of the Khachaturian International Competition.

== Early life ==
Smbatyan was born in Yerevan, Armenia in the family of musicians. His father, Armen Smbatyan is a composer and diplomat, and his grandmother Tatiana Hayrapetyan was a violinist, a pedagogue and long-standing director of Tchaikovsky Secondary Music School.

Smbatyan studied violin from an early age and graduated from the Yerevan Komitas State Conservatory under the guidance of conductor Yuri Davtyan. He later graduated from the Moscow Tchaikovsky State Conservatory and upon that, continued his studies at the Royal Academy of Music in London. He also received the academic degree of Candidate of Arts from the Institute of Arts of the National Academy of Sciences of Armenia.

In 2006, at the age of 18, Smbatyan founded the Armenian State Youth Orchestra, which was later renamed the Armenian State Symphony Orchestra.

== Career ==
Smbatyan began his active career as a conductor in 2006, following the founding of the Armenian State Symphony Orchestra. Since its foundation, under Smbatyan's leadership, the orchestra was transformed from a youth ensemble into a fully professional orchestra and has become one of the leading orchestras in Armenia.

In parallel with serving as the Artistic Director and Principal Conductor to the orchestra, Smbatyan gained popularity within the classical music industry and soon appeared as a guest conductor with famous orchestras, among which Russian Philharmonic Orchestra, Dresden Philharmonic Orchestra, the Warsaw Philharmonic Orchestra, and others.

In 2011, Smbatyan assembled what was described as the first UNICEF Children’s Chamber Orchestra, established to mark the 20th anniversary of the Convention on the Rights of the Child. In October 2010, the orchestra participated in the “Autumn Fairy-Tale” International Competition-Festival in Prague, where it was awarded the Grand Prix and first prize in the “Instrumental Classical Music” category.

In 2015, Smbatyan founded the “24/04” Orchestra to commemorate the centenary of the Armenian Genocide. He subsequently established the All Armenian “Generation of Independence” Orchestra and Choir as part of the events dedicated to the 25th anniversary of the independence of the Republic of Armenia.

Since 2019, he has served as the Principal Conductor at Malta Philharmonic Orchestra.

In 2024, Smbatyan went on his debut tour in the United States with the Armenian State Symphony Orchestra, performing at Symphony Hall Boston, New York City’s Carnegie Hall, and Los Angeles Music Center’s Walt Disney Concert Hall.

In recent concert seasons, Smbatyan led concerts with the Armenian State Symphony and Malta Philharmonic Orchestras throughout Europe and the United States. Notable venues include:

- Carnegie Hall (New York)
- Symphony Hall Boston (Boston)
- Walt Disney Concert Hall (Los Angeles)
- Barbican Centre (London)
- Cité de la musique - Philharmonie de Paris (Paris)
- Shanghai Grand Theatre (Shanghai)

He has collaborated with many international orchestras:

- Royal Bangkok Symphony Orchestra (RBSO)
- Malta Philharmonic Orchestra — principal conductor since 2019. In the 2025–26 season, Smbatyan led the Malta Philharmonic Orchestra in a tour including UK dates on 9 November 2025 in Norwich and 12 November 2025 at Cadogan Hall, London.
- Brașov Philharmonic (Romanian National Philharmonic Orchestra) — featured in collaboration with Maxim Vengerov. The orchestra replaced Malta Philharmonic Orchestra for its UK tour of 2022–23.

Smbatyan was appointed as UNICEF National Ambassador for UNICEF Armenia in 2023, where he has supported the development of music‑based education programs to enhance children’s development. He was later reappointed to continue his role in January 2025, furthering initiatives that connect music, education, and child welfare.

At the age of 28, Smbatyan received the title of Chevalier of the Ordre des Arts et des Lettres, awarded by the Minister of Culture and Communication of France. In 2016 he was awarded the title of Honored Artist of the Republic of Armenia.

== Reception ==
The Guardian praised his performance with the Romanian National Philharmonic Orchestra.

The Times noted his interpretation of Ravel and Bruch.

New York Classical Review called his concert “an impressive showing”.

The Violin Channel announced the appointment of a new Principal Guest Conductor of the Berlin Symphony Orchestra.

== Selected recordings ==
- Images from the Great Siege & Verdiana (2020, with London Symphony Orchestra)
- Aznavouriana Camille Thomas, and the Armenian State Symphony Orchestra
