= Oxford University Music Society =

- Institution: University of Oxford
- Established: 1872

Officers
- Senior Member: Prof. Laura Tunbridge
- President: Lucian Ng, St Hugh's
- Vice President: Thomas Constantinou, Queen's
- Home Page: OUMS
- Flagship Orchestra: OUO

The Oxford University Music Society (OUMS) is one of the oldest societies in the University of Oxford, England, tracing its origins back to 1872. The Society was formed in 1916 by the merger of the Oxford University Musical Club, founded in 1872, and the Oxford University Musical Union, founded in 1884. Originally called the Oxford University Musical Club and Union, it changed its name to the Oxford University Musical Society in 1983.

== Overview ==
The Oxford University Musical Club ran the Public Classical Concerts series from 1891 to 1914. These led to the Oxford Subscription Concerts series subsequently. The concerts included the Oxford Symphony Orchestra. The Oxford University Music Club also sponsored weekly concerts in the historic Holywell Music Room. Sir James Steuart Wilson (1889–1966) sang for the Club.

OUMS was founded to promote the appreciation and performance of music within Oxford University. OUMS runs eight ensembles:

- Oxford University Orchestra (professionally conducted symphony orchestra)
- Oxford University Philharmonia (student conducted symphony orchestra)
- Oxford University Sinfonietta (elite chamber music ensemble)
- Oxford University Chorus (large non-auditioning choir and orchestra)
- Oxford University String Ensemble
- Oxford University Wind Orchestra
- Oxford University Jazz Orchestra
- Oxford University Brass Band

In addition to the above ensembles, the Oxford University Chamber Music Society, Oxford Millennium Orchestra, and Oxford Chamber Orchestra (alumni orchestra) are affiliated with OUMS.

OUMS is supported by the Oxford University Music Faculty.

== See also ==
- Oxford University Jazz Society
- Oxford Symphony Orchestra

== Bibliography ==
- Hibbert, Christopher; Hibbert, Edward, eds. (1988). The Encyclopaedia of Oxford. London: Macmillan. pp. 265–268, 305–306. ISBN 0-333-39917-X.
