= Aylesbury Music Centre Dance Band =

British musical collective

The AMC Dance Band, with its director Nick Care in the foreground, as it appeared on the back cover of its 1995 album Doin' Time

The Aylesbury Music Centre Dance Band (also known as the AMC Dance Band) was a big band for children and young adults aged around 14 to 18 based at the Aylesbury Music Centre, an educational establishment founded in 1965 in Buckinghamshire, England. Notable alumni of the band include Leo Green, Mark Armstrong, and Jules Buckley.

== History ==
The Aylesbury Music Centre Dance Band was founded sometime prior to 1985. In that year, the direction of the band was handed to Nick Care, under whose leadership the band rose to prominence within the world of British youth jazz. Members were aged around 14–18, with 30–50% leaving each year as they left school for work or higher education, necessitating continual education of new members.

The band played a number of jazz festivals, including the Aberdeen Jazz Festival, Birmingham International Jazz Festival, Montreux Jazz Festival (gaining an International Association for Jazz Education Outstanding Performance Award), the North Sea Jazz Festival, and Soho Jazz Festival. Other venues played, usually in conjunction with youth music events, included Buckingham Palace, the London Palladium, Royal Albert Hall, and Royal Festival Hall. The band worked, and shared the stage, with many international artists.

The band performed on the BBC children's programme Blue Peter seven times, also appearing with Django Bates on Sky TV and on Radio France. Members of the band were alongside other Aylesbury Music Centre students who performed as the Hogwarts Orchestra in the 2005 film Harry Potter and the Goblet of Fire.

The band seems to have come to an end around 2014, when the Aylesbury Music Centre transitioned from being part of state education to being an independent trust, and Care took redundancy. Care continued, however, to conduct a band comprising former members of the Aylesbury Music Centre Dance Band known first as the Alumni Band and then as the Nick Care Big Band. These continued to perform annual concerts at the Court Theatre, Tring, a tradition which the AMC Dance Band had begun in 1997. The Nick Care Big Band continued to play until around 2018. Around 150 alumni of the band reassembled in 2023 to play a memorial concert following Care's death.

=== Nick Care ===
For around three decades, the Aylesbury Music Centre Dance Band was directed by Nick Care. Born in 1958, Care grew up in Leytonstone, working in his father's shoe shop. Care attended Junior Trinity College of Music classes as an Essex Music Scholar, taking Grade 8 and a Diploma in Trumpet, and from 1970 to 1978 studied for BA Hons. Music at the Colchester Institute (then the North East Essex Technical College Music Department). From 1977, Care played with the Farnaby Brass Ensemble, sharing in its multiple wins of the Ifor James brass competition trophy. From around 1980 he also played in Brass Tacks, alongside Kathy Gifford, who became a fellow-teacher and Care's wife. Care qualified as a teacher in the early 1980s, spent 18 months teaching in Hampshire, and then took a position at the Aylesbury Music Centre. He began conducting the Aylesbury Music Centre Dance Band in 1985.

At the Aylesbury Music Centre, Care also directed the Junior Brass band, and as a peripatetic music teacher established bands at Aylesbury Grammar School, Aylesbury High School, Sir Henry Floyd Grammar School, and Turnfurlong Junior School. These groups too won a number of awards—for example the Aylesbury Grammar School Jazz Band came second in the 1995 Daily Telegraph Central Television Jazz Band of the Year Competition—with Turnfurlong Junior Jazz Band also appearing on CBeebies. Care was noted for motivating his young musicians through a delicately poised balance of encouragement and disparagement, the latter involving an idiosyncratic and elaborate vocabulary of which "rancid" was a "long-running favourite" term. He was characterised by the former Dance Band trumpeter Jules Buckley as "a true guru—a master who could unlock and present to me the secrets of the musical world, absolutely without ego, and with a selfless generosity that is beyond measure".

Care was diagnosed in 2016 with a rare combination of Motor Neurone Disease and Frontotemporal Dementia, working into 2018 while also contributing to research projects on his conditions. He died in 2020, aged 62.

=== Awards ===
In 1987, the band entered the National Festival of Music for Youth for the first time and was given 'highly commended' status; it went on to win a total of at least nine awards at different iterations of the Festival.

Among other awards, the band won the BBC National Big Band Competition (an annual competition characterised by The Guardian as "a fixture in the station's schedules" from 1975 to 2006): the band won in the youth section four times, including 1992, 1995, and 1998 (and were runners-up three times), participating in at least one BBC Radio 2 Big Band Special. The ensemble also became the first to win the Daily Telegraph Young Jazz Competition National Award twice, in 1989 and 1995.

== Albums ==
The band released two albums.

=== Doin' Time, 1995 ===
The band's first album, Doin' Time, was recorded in Buckingham, 19–20 April 1995. Tracks were: Magic time / Marie's shuffle / Satin doll / Sad Afrika / Night's high noon / Bill Bailey / Sing, sing, sing / Feels so good / Moanin' / Party hearty / Dance for human folk / Just friends / On purple porpoise highway / Midnight oil.

=== Beyond the Limit, 1999 ===
The band's second album, a collaboration with Salena Jones, was recorded at Great Linford Manor, 2–3 April 1999, and received positive reviews. Tracks were: Do me wrong, but do me / Carmelos' by the freeway / Life's suite: Clear blue water – Echoes runes and ciphers – Composite motion / Here's that rainy day / Misbehavin' / Beyond the limits / La muchacha de Columbia / My romance / Intensive blue / Balim / Theme from The Naked Gun / Log.
