= Mark Armstrong (musician) =

British composer and jazz trumpeter

Mark Armstrong (born 5 November 1972) is a British jazz trumpeter, musical director, composer, arranger, and educator.

== Early life and education ==
Armstrong was born on 5 November 1972) in Newcastle upon Tyne, northern England. At the age of five he moved to Amersham and attended Dr Challoner's Grammar School, playing with the Aylesbury Music Centre Dance Band and Buckinghamshire County Youth Orchestra.

He studied for a degree in music at the University of Oxford, when he played with the Oxford University Jazz Orchestra and helped to reform the Oxford University Big Band. He subsequently took a postgraduate course in jazz and studio music at the Guildhall School of Music and Drama in London.

== Career ==
Armstrong is a jazz trumpeter, musical director, composer, arranger, and academic. He has also performed in a wide range of commercial settings, including the London Sinfonietta, with The Four Tops, and on film and TV soundtracks. He has composed and arranged many types of music, including chamber music, jazz, and symphony orchestra.

From 2008, Armstrong was jazz professor at the Royal College of Music (RCM) in London. Since 2011 and as of 2017, he was the artistic and music director of the UK National Youth Jazz Orchestra (NYJO), and directed the RCM Swing Band and the RCM Big Band.

As of March 2024 he no longer appears on the NYJO website.

As of March 2024 Armstrong is the RCM Jazz Professor. He is also a member of the Ronnie Scott's Jazz Orchestra and Robin Jones's Latin Underground.

== Recognition and awards ==
Armstrong was nominated in the best trumpet category of the 2007 Ronnie Scott Jazz Awards, and won the BBC Big Band Competition arranging prize.

== Personal life ==
As of 2024, Armstrong lives in Blackheath, south-east London, with his wife, conductor Elinor Corp, and their three children.
