= Stephen Higgins (conductor) =

British conductor and presenter

- Education: University of Oxford; Guildhall School of Music and Drama; National Opera Studio
- Occupations: Conductor, accompanist, arranger and presenter

Stephen Higgins is a British conductor, accompanist, arranger and presenter.

== Biography ==
Higgins attended the University of Oxford, where he played with the Oxford University Jazz Orchestra. He then studied at the Guildhall School of Music and Drama in London, and the National Opera Studio, also in London. He is a conductor and pianist, working with opera houses in the United Kingdom, including English National Opera (ENO), Glyndebourne, the Royal Opera House (ROH), and Scottish Opera. Higgins is a member of the music staff at ENO. He has conducted the Magic Flute for ENO and created a new commission, The Duchess of Malfi.

Higgins has worked for the Musica nel Chiostro Opera Festival in Batignano, Tuscany, Italy, as music director. In addition, he was music director of Opera Faber in northern Portugal, conducting performances of Don Giovanni and L'elisir d'amore with the Orquesta da Norte and the Orquesta Nacional de Porto. He also conducted the London Philharmonic Orchestra and the Philharmonia orchestra at the Royal Festival Hall in London, in the production of Carmen Jones by Jude Kelly.

As well as live performances, Higgins has worked for film and television companies as music supervisor, including films and documentaries for BBC Two, Channel 4, and Film4. For example, he appeared on BBC Two's Maestro at the Opera with actress and comedian Josie Lawrence in 2012.
