= Marios Papadopoulos (musician) =

British conductor (born 1954)

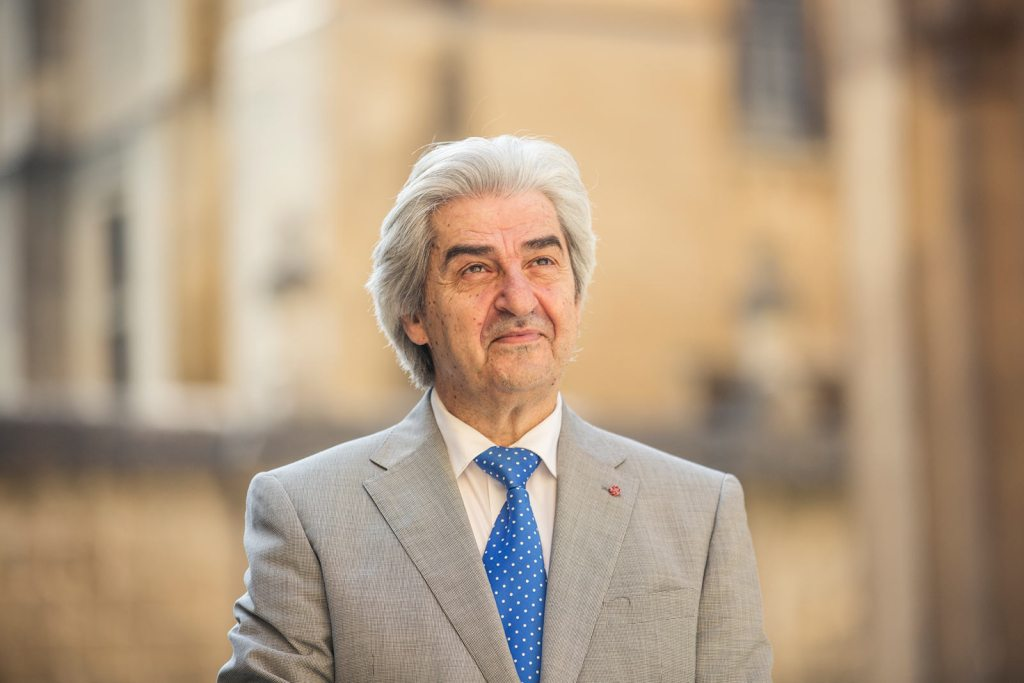
- Marios Papadopoulos, conductor and pianist
- Born: Marios Papadopoulos; 20 December 1954 (age 71); Limassol, Cyprus
- Occupations: Conductor and pianist of classical music
- Years active: 1975–present
- Known for: Conductor of Oxford Philharmonic Orchestra
- Website: mariospapadopoulos.co.uk

Marios Papadopoulos MBE (born 20 December 1954 in Limassol, Cyprus) is a Cypriot-born, British conductor and pianist. He is the founder and music director of the Oxford Philharmonic Orchestra, the Orchestra in Residence at the University of Oxford.

== Early life ==
Born in Cyprus, Papadopoulos began playing the piano at the age of 5. In 1967, he moved with his family to the UK to continue his musical education. His teachers were Ilona Kabos and Gina Bachauer. In 1969, at the age of 14, he received the ARCM Diploma from the Royal College of Music. In 1971, he made his debut at the Royal Festival Hall as soloist with the Royal Philharmonic Orchestra in one of the Robert Mayer Concerts for Children.

In 1972, he won the piano category prize in the Greater London Arts Association's Young Musicians Scheme. In the same year, Sir Michael Tippett invited him to appear at the Bath International Music Festival in recital and as soloist in Tippett's Fantasia on a Theme by Handel conducted by the composer.

== Career ==
Papadopoulos elicited high praise from the press with his 1974 London debut at the Queen Elizabeth Hall. Bryce Morrison described it in The Times as “an astonishing debut”. Following his recital in the Queen Elizabeth Hall a year later, the same critic described Papadopoulos in The New Grove Dictionary of Music and Musicians (1975 edition) as having “all the attributes of one of the world's greatest players”. He has since gone on to enjoy an international career both as pianist and conductor.

He has appeared as soloist with and conducted orchestras, and worked with musicians including Vladimir Ashkenazy, Nicola Benedetti, Anne-Sophie Mutter, Maria João Pires, Menahem Pressler, Maxim Vengerov, Renée Fleming, Joyce DiDonato, Evgeny Kissin, Martha Argerich and Lang Lang.

In 1998, he founded the Oxford Philharmonic Orchestra, the city's professional symphony orchestra and the Orchestra in Residence at the University of Oxford. He remains the orchestra's Music Director to this day.

Papadopoulos has directed from the keyboard the complete cycle of all the Mozart Piano Concertos three times in his career. He has also conducted three complete cycles of the Beethoven symphonies and Piano Concertos directing from the keyboard. A fourth complete cycle of the symphonies and concertos as part of the 2020 Oxford Beethoven Festival to celebrate the composer's 250th anniversary was cut short due to the COVID-19 pandemic.

Guest conducting and soloist appearances included a 2015 UK tour with the London Philharmonic Orchestra and Alison Balsom, Philharmonia Orchestra & Chorus, European Union Chamber Orchestra, and the Royal Philharmonic Orchestra. In March 2018, Papadopoulos appeared with the Guangzhou Symphony Orchestra at the Xinghai Concert Hall in China, directing Mozart Piano Concertos from the keyboard.

In 2018, he conducted a new production of “The Marriage of Figaro” for the Greek National Opera at the Stavros Niarchos Foundation Cultural Center in Athens.

In 2026, he formed the Oxford International Opera, a new opera company connected to the Oxford Philharmonic Orchestra alongside Sir Bryn Terfel who will act as artistic director. Their first production is Tosca in September 2026.

He became an Honorary Fellow of the Worshipful Company of Musicians in 2010 and was awarded Oxford City's Certificate of Honour in 2013. Papadopoulos was awarded an MBE in the Queen's 2014 New Year's Honours List for services to music in Oxford.

== Recordings ==
A prolific recording artist, Papadopoulos's catalogue includes his Beethoven sonatas, performances of Stravinsky's Concerto for Piano and Wind with the Royal Philharmonic Orchestra (Hyperion), works by Mozart, Mussorgsky, César Franck and the twenty-four Preludes and Fugues by Shostakovich. Most recordings are now available on the Oxford Philharmonic Orchestra record label. He conducts the Oxford Philharmonic in new recordings of the Brahms and Sibelius violin concertos with Maxim Vengerov as soloist. As a pianist, he and Maxim Vengerov have recorded the complete Brahms violin sonatas and performed these in a recital at Vienna's Musikverein in September 2016.

- Janáček & Stravinsky: Capriccio & Piano Concerto, Marios Papadopoulos (piano)

Release Date: 7th Jan 1989, Catalogue No: CDA66167, Label: Hyperion, Length: 53 minutes

- The Enlightened Trumpet, Paul Merkelo, Oxford Philharmonic Orchestra & Marios Papadopoulos

Release Date: 6th Sep 2019, Catalogue No: G010004146008F, Label: Sony, Length: 49 minutes

- Volume 14, Album 1 - William Bogzestor, Israel Schorr etc. - The Great Age of Cantorial Art in America, Barcelona Symphony and Catalonia National Orchestra, Oxford Philomusica, Elli Jaffe, Marios Papadopoulos, Jorge Mester

Release Date: 4th Sep 2012, Catalogue No: MAV1401, Label: Milken Archive Digital, Length: 76 minutes

- Franck: Piano Music, Marios Papadopoulos (Piano)

Release Date: 2nd Dec 2009, Label: Meridian, Length: 72 minutes

- Volume 11, Album 6 - Sheila Silver, Jan Radzynski etc. - Orchestral Works of Jewish Spirit, Barcelona Symphony and Catalonia National Orchestra, Seattle Symphony Orchestra, Oxford Philomusica, Jorge Mester, Gerard Schwarz, Marios Papadopoulos, Karl Anton Rickenbacher

Release Date: 1st Sep 2011, Catalogue No: MAV1106, Label: Milken Archive Digital, Length: 61 minutes

- American Classics - Introducing the World of American Jewish Music - Rare, new and rediscovered American Classics

Release Date: 1st Nov 2004, Catalogue No: 8559406, Label: Naxos, Length: 79 minutes

- Milken Archive of Jewish Music: The American Experience

Release Date: 2nd Sep 2016, Catalogue No: MAV2005, Label: Milken Archive Digital, Length: 91 minutes

- American Classics - Cantor Benzion Miller sings Cantorial Concert Masterpieces, Barcelona Symphony Orchestra/National Orchestra of Catalonia, Elli Jaffe

Release Date: 3rd Feb 2005, Catalogue No: 8559416, Label: Naxos, Length: 78 minutes

- Beethoven Piano Sonatas, Marios Papadopoulos (piano)

Release Date: 9th Aug 2007, Catalogue No: OP001, Label: Oxford Philomusica
