= Euan Ashley =

American professor of medicine

Euan Ashley FRCP
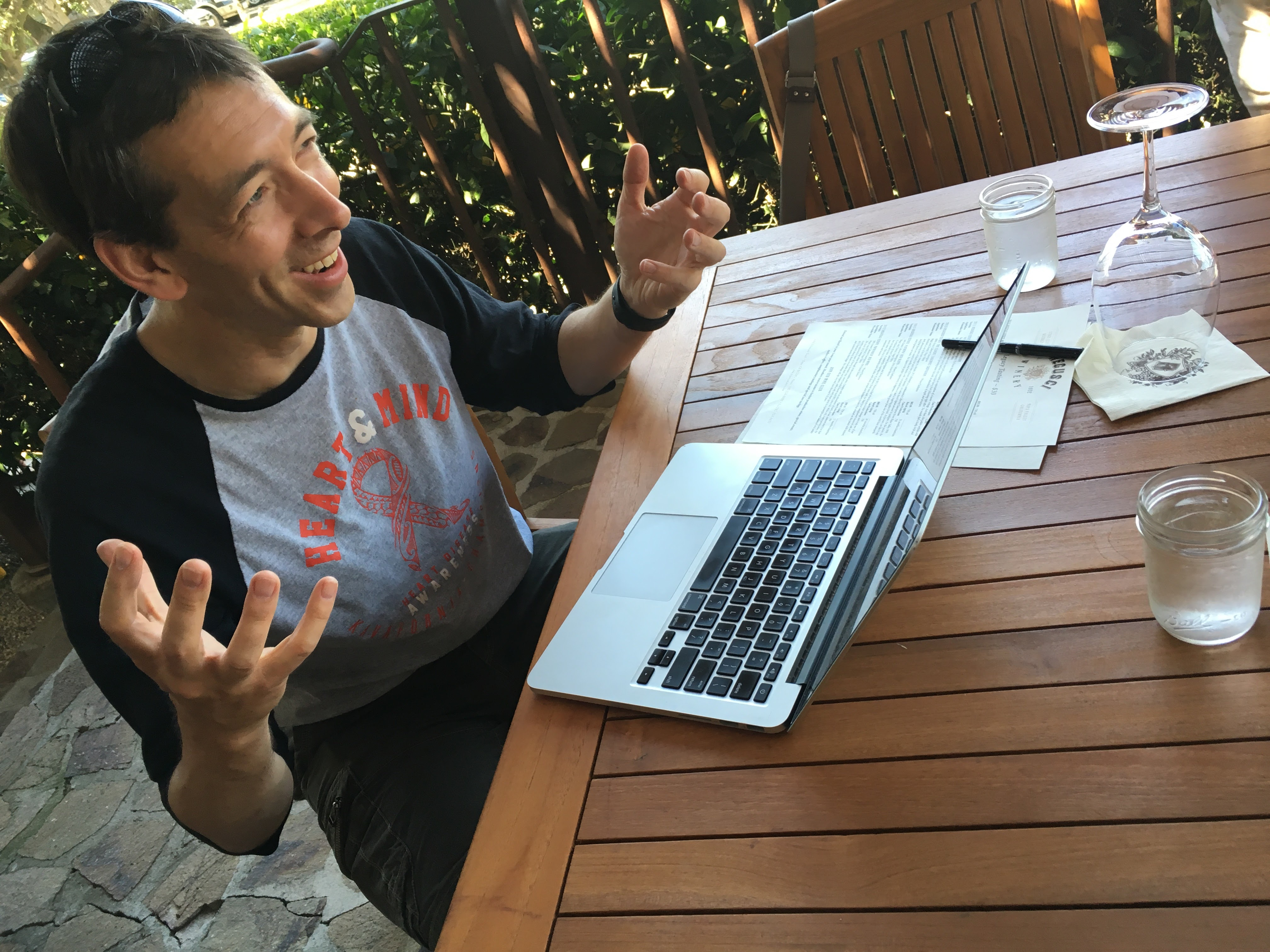
- Education: University of Glasgow (BSc & MB ChB); University of Oxford (PhD)
- Known for: Genomics, Precision medicine, MyHeart Counts
- Awards: Fellow of the Royal College of Physicians, National Innovation Award, American Heart Association NIH Director's New Innovator Award, AHA Council on Genomic and Precision Medicine Medal of Honor, Guggenheim Fellowship Award
- Scientific career
- Workplaces: Stanford University
- Thesis: Nitric oxide and cardiac function (2002)
- Doctoral advisor: Barbara Casadei
- Other academic advisors: Hugh Watkins
- Website: ashleylab.stanford.edu

Euan Angus Ashley is a Scottish physician, scientist, author, and founder based at Stanford University in California where he is the Arthur L. Bloomfield Chair of the Department of Medicine. He is known for helping establish the field of precision medicine.

== Education and early life ==
Ashley was born and raised in the West of Scotland and attended Kelvinside Academy in Glasgow. As a teenager, he programmed computers and read popular science books on genetics. He studied Physiology and Medicine at the University of Glasgow graduating with 1st class Honors. He completed residency training at the Oxford Deanery and received his Doctorate (DPhil) from the University of Oxford (Christ Church College). At Stanford University in California, he completed post-doctoral research and specialized training in cardiology, joining the faculty in 2006. He was appointed Associate Dean in 2020.

== Leadership ==
=== Stanford Department of Medicine ===
Ashley is the Chair of the Department of Medicine at Stanford. It is the University's largest department with 15 divisions, over 800 faculty, 500 trainees, and 1200 academic and administrative staff.

=== Stanford Center for Inherited Cardiovascular Disease ===
Ashley founded the Center for Inherited Cardiovascular Disease in 2009. It grew out of a clinic established with Heidi Salisbury RN in 2006. The Center is one of the largest in the world providing integrated care for patients with inherited cardiovascular diseases like cardiomyopathy, channelopathy, familial lipoprotein syndromes, aortopathies and neuromuscular disease. An annual fundraising run includes patients, faculty, staff and silicon valley celebrities like Mark Zuckerberg. In 2023, Victoria Parikh took over as director.

== Research ==
=== Genomics ===
Ashley is best known for his study of the human genome. In 2009, he led the team that carried out one of the first medical interpretations of a human genome. The work published in The Lancet laid out a general framework for the medical analysis of a complete human genome and applied this framework to the genome of his Stanford colleague, Stephen Quake. Quake had invented a technology to sequence his own genome, becoming the fifth individual in the world to be sequenced. The landmark medical analysis was reported in news media internationally and was later featured in the Smithsonian museum.

In 2010, Ashley's team carried out the first whole-genome molecular autopsy generating data from the same Helicos sequencing technology of post-mortem cardiac tissue from a patient who died suddenly at a young age of presumed cardiac cause.

In 2011, his team developed a framework for family-based medical genome analysis. The West family were the first family to have their genomes sequenced and were four of the ten individuals sequenced as part of Illumina's personal genome sequencing project. Other individuals in this first group of ten included Illumina CEO Jay Flatley and the actress Glenn Close. The computational tools developed by Ashley's team included inheritance tools for mendelian diagnosis in trios and quartets, family based polygenic risk scores, whole genome phasing, HLA typing, and automated star-allele calling for pharmacogenomics.

Over the following years, Ashley's team helped establish genome sequencing as a fundamental tool for diagnosis in clinical medicine. In 2014, they reported in the Journal of the American Medical Association a study of genome sequencing in primary care, demonstrating early detection of pathogenic variations in the breast and ovarian cancer gene BRCA2, and delivering tools for cardiometabolic polygenic risk scoring, and pharmacogenomics. This work also introduced quality-coverage metrics. Ashley was interviewed for NPR's Morning Edition.

In 2017, Ashley's team made the first medical diagnosis using long-read sequencing in a patient with Carney complex whose targeted Sanger sequencing and short read whole genome sequencing had been unrevealing. Developing a pipeline for clinical diagnosis based on aligning, variant calling and filtering Pacific Biosciences SMRT sequencing data, the team identified a previously unrecognized 2 kilobase deletion in PRKAR1A, the gene responsible for Carney complex.

In 2018, as the first co-chair of the steering committee of the Undiagnosed Diseases Network (UDN) Ashley led the network's analysis published in the New England Journal of Medicine that reported an overall diagnosis rate of 35%, estimated significant cost savings from early application, and defined 31 new medical syndromes. This was reported widely including on CBS This Morning, NPR's Morning Edition, and the New York Times where it featured in a segment titled This Week in Good News.

In 2022 Ashley and his research team developed ultra-rapid nanopore genome sequencing for critically ill patients. Published in the New England Journal of Medicine and Nature Biotechnology, the team showed that a genetic diagnosis from whole genome sequencing was possible in as little as 7 hours and 18 minutes. This achievement was recognized by the National Institute for Standards and Technology as well as by Guinness World Records who awarded the team a new record for "fastest DNA sequencing technique." Ashley appeared on NBC Evening News to discuss the findings.

=== Artificial intelligence ===
Over the past decade, Ashley has contributed foundational advances in artificial intelligence across a spectrum of biomedical science, from molecular applications through to clinical practice. He has described experimenting with neural networks at Stanford in the 1990s while a visiting student. With Markus Covert and David Van Valen, he published one of the first applications of deep learning to biomedical imaging in 2016, demonstrating convolutional neural network-based segmentation of single cells in brightfield microscopy. Separate work focused on the morphology of mammalian cells in microfluidic flow and led to the founding of the company Deepcell. In genomic medicine, along with Google, Nvidia and Oxford Nanopore, his team applied transformer-focused base-calling and convolutional network variant-calling to achieve the fastest recorded clinical human genome sequencing, a record recognized by Guinness World Records and the National Institute of Standards and Technology, with findings published simultaneously in the New England Journal of Medicine and Nature Biotechnology. Working with Apple, his group launched the My Heart Counts cardiovascular health study and applied deep learning approaches to wearable data. Independently, they published one of the earliest multimodal deep learning models in the medical literature, combining electrocardiographic and echocardiographic inputs within a single architecture. David Ouyang, one of Ashley's postdocs with James Zou, developed EchoNet, the first deep learning system for cardiac video analysis, published in Nature in 2020. His team also applied large-scale AI methods to imaging data from nearly 100,000 participants in the UK Biobank, producing genome-wide association studies of cardiac flow volumes and heart failure with preserved ejection fraction. In 2026, his group developed MARCUS, an agentic multimodal vision-language model capable of interpreting electrocardiograms, echocardiograms, and cardiac MRIs in a conversational clinical setting, and along with Google DeepMind published in Nature Medicine one of the first randomized controlled trials of a conversational AI agent in cardiology practice. Companion work identified a fundamental vulnerability in the evaluation of vision-language models, termed mirage reasoning, in which frontier models generate detailed image descriptions and achieve high benchmark scores on medical imaging tasks without access to any image input. Ashley's team also contributed to Evo2, a large generative model of DNA sequences developed with the Arc Institute and Nvidia, published in Nature in 2026. Ashley is a founding editorial board member of NEJM AI and has reviewed the impact of AI on cardiology and molecular medicine.

== Awards and honors ==
Ashley is a recipient of the National Innovation Award from the American Heart Association (AHA) as well as the National Institutes of Health (NIH) Director's New Innovator Award. In 2017, he was recognized by the Obama White House for contributions to personalized and precision medicine. In 2019, he was awarded the American Heart Association Medal of Honor for Genomics and Precision Medicine. In 2021, he became the first holder of the Roger and Joelle Burnell Chair in Genomics and Precision Health at Stanford University. In April 2023, he was awarded the Guggenheim Fellowship, a prestigious honor recognizing mid-career scholars, artists, and scientists who have demonstrated a previous capacity for outstanding work and continue to show exceptional promise. In 2025, Ashley was inducted into the National Academy of Medicine.

== Scientific publications ==
Ashley has co-authored over 400 peer reviewed publications.

== Books ==
=== Cardiology Explained ===
In 2004, Ashley published the textbook Cardiology Explained along with co-author Josef Niebauer (Remedica, London). According to the publisher's notes, the title "...explains the basic physiology and pathophysiologic mechanisms of cardiovascular disease in a straightforward and diagrammatic manner, gives guidelines as to when referral is appropriate, and, uniquely, explains what the specialist is likely to do."

=== The Genome Odyssey ===
Ashley released the non-fiction title The Genome Odyssey: Medical Mysteries and the Incredible Quest to Solve Them on February 23, 2021, with Celadon Books, a division of Macmillan Publishers. The book features stories of patients and families from Ashley's medical practice and walks through the science underlying those diseases, shining a spotlight on some of the scientists. New York Times best-selling author Abraham Verghese remarked that The Genome Odyssey was "destined to be a landmark narrative in the canon of modern science." The Pulitzer Prize winning author Siddartha Muhkerjee wrote that "Dr Ashley, one of the pioneers of gene sequencing technologies, writes with authority, elegance and simplicity." The Wall Street Journal described The Genome Odyssey as an "impassioned, firsthand account of the effort to bring genomic data into clinical practice."

== Media ==
Ashley has appeared on National Public Radio in the United States as well as the BBC radio, Japanese and Indian national television, and NBC Evening News. His work has been covered in print by The New York Times, The Wall Street Journal, The Guardian, The Times of London, The Economist, The Daily Telegraph, Technology Review, and others. His work with the Undiagnosed Diseases Network was covered by National Public Radio and The New York Times.

== Startup companies ==
Ashley is co-founder of multiple companies.

=== Personalis ===
In 2012, Ashley co-founded Personalis, a genome-scale diagnostics company with Stanford colleagues Russ Altman, Atul Butte, Mike Snyder and businessman John West. West was the former CEO of Solexa and managed the sale of its core business to Illumina, Inc. In a 2021 earnings call, CEO John West stated that Personalis has sequenced more genomes than any other private company in the US. The company focuses on cancer diagnostics.

=== Deepcell ===
Ashley co-founded Deepcell along with Maddison Masaeli (a former post doc in his lab) and Mahyar Salek (a computer scientist). Deepcell develops imaging and microfluidics platforms that use artificial intelligence to identify and isolate viable cells based on morphological distinctions.

=== Svexa ===
Ashley is co-founder and chairman of the board at Silicon Valley Exercise Analytics (Svexa), a sports intelligence company that combines physical, subjective and biological data to offer optimized training, performance and recovery recommendations for athletes and teams. He co-founded Svexa with Mikael Mattson, a Swedish physiologist who completed part of his PhD in Ashley's lab, Daryl Waggott who worked as a computational biologist in Ashley's lab, and Filip Larsen, a longtime collaborator of Mattson.

== Company boards ==
=== AstraZeneca ===
Ashley was appointed as a Non-Executive Director of the pharmaceutical company AstraZeneca in October 2020. In July 2021, the company acquired Boston-based rare disease company Alexion Pharmaceuticals in a $40 billion deal. During the pandemic, the company licensed a COVID vaccine from the University of Oxford and distributed more than 3 billion doses of the vaccine globally mostly to low- and moderate-income countries. According to company statements, close to 2 billion doses were distributed at cost.

=== Dexcom ===
In 2025, Ashley was appointed to the Board of Directors of Dexcom, Inc., a publicly traded medical technology company specializing in continuous glucose monitoring systems for people with diabetes. Dexcom is a global leader in real-time glucose sensing, serving millions of users in more than 100 countries through its G6, G7, and integrated digital health platforms. The company has reported annual revenues exceeding $4 billion and continues to expand its role in advancing connected, data-driven diabetes management worldwide.

== Music ==
Ashley learned jazz saxophone as a teenager and joined Scotland's regional youth jazz orchestra including tours to the Montreux Jazz Festival, Poland and the USA. Forming a jazz saxophone quartet with members of its saxophone section, The Hung Drawn Quartet featured Ashley, Raymond MacDonald, Graeme Wilson and Allon Beauvoisin and performed a mix of original compositions and arrangements of jazz standards. They released two albums (Cookin' with the HDQ and A Train in the Distance) appeared multiple times on BBC Radio and contributed an arrangement of Charlie Mingus' Haitian Fight Song to the David Byrne-produced soundtrack for the movie Young Adam featuring Ewan McGregor, Tilda Swinton, and Emily Mortimer. They toured in the US (Philadelphia, New York) and Ontario, Canada in 1994. Ashley also performed in duo and quartet format at the Glasgow International Jazz Festival with Malcolm Finlay, Stuart Brown and others as part of the group Universal.

While at Oxford University, Ashley directed the Oxford University Jazz Orchestra a period of tenure that included band tours to the Glasgow International Jazz Festival, honors at the BBC big band competition, and the release of the live album Know Where you Are with bebop legend Peter King.

== Personal life ==
Ashley lives in Stanford, California with his wife, Fiona, and their three children. According to his Stanford biography, he is also a private pilot. His childrens names are Cameron youngest Fraser middle and the oldest is a girl
