= Else Streit =

German composer (born 1869)

Else Streit (born 27 July 1869) was a German composer, pianist, teacher, and violinist.

Streit was born in Lauenburg, Pomerania, then part of the Kingdom of Prussia. She studied music at the Karlsruhe Conservatory and the Stern Conservatory. Her teachers included Heinrich Deeke, Gustav Hollaender, Stephan Krehl and Max Loewengar.

Streit taught violin, piano, and music theory at the Bromberg Conservatory, the Klindworth-Scharwenka Conservatory, and the New Conservatory, Charlottenburg. She also taught privately in Berlin.

Streit's music, in opus numbers through at least 25, was published by Adolf Martin Schlesinger. Her compositions include:

== Chamber ==
- Romance in B minor (violin and piano)
- Sonata (violin and piano)

== Opera ==
- St. Nikolaus und seine Gehilfen

== Orchestra ==
- Festmarsch for Infantry
- Symphonietta (string orchestra)
- Theme and Variations

== Vocal ==
- Drei Lieder, opus 25
- "Es war einmal", opus 7
- "Psalm" (soprano, violin and organ)
- Vier Lieder, opus 21
- Vier Lieder, opus 22
- "Weihnacht"
