= Oxford Symphony Orchestra =

Non-professional large orchestra based in Oxford

- Orchestra
- Founded: 1902
- Location: Oxford
- Principal conductor: Robert Max

The Oxford Symphony Orchestra is a non-professional large orchestra based in Oxford. It formerly was known as the Oxford Orchestral Society and (prior to 1919) Dr Allen's Orchestra. It was founded by Sir Hugh Allen, who served as its first conductor, in 1902. Maurice Besly was his immediate successor.

== See also ==
- Oxford University Music Society
- Oxford Philharmonic Orchestra
- Oxford University Orchestra
- Oxford University Philharmonia
