= Brașov Philharmonic =

Romanian symphony orchestra based in Brașov

- Orchestra
- Native name: Filarmonica Brașov
- Founded: 1878
- Concert hall: Sala Patria, Brașov
- Principal conductor: Cristian Oroșanu
- Website: filarmonicabrasov.ro

The Brașov Philharmonic (Romanian: Filarmonica Brașov), also touring as the Romanian National Philharmonic Orchestra, is a musical institution and symphony orchestra based in Brașov, Romania. It traces its origins to the Kronstädter Philharmonische Gesellschaft, established in Brașov in 1878.

== History ==
The first concert of the Brașov Philharmonic Society took place on 6 May 1878 under the direction of Anton Brandner, who is regarded as the founder and first organiser of the institution. The society was initially connected with the cultural life of the Transylvanian Saxons, but it soon included members of the wider urban community of Brașov. Among its honorary members was George Enescu, who later also performed in Brașov with the orchestra.

Between 1878 and 1944, the Philharmonic Society developed regular concert activity in Brașov. Its repertoire included works by composers such as Joseph Haydn, Wolfgang Amadeus Mozart, Franz Schubert, Robert Schumann and Ludwig van Beethoven. Musicians associated with the Brașov stage in this period included Joseph Joachim, Johannes Brahms, Richard Strauss, Felix Weingartner, George Enescu, Edwin Fischer and Joseph Prunner. After Brandner's death, the ensemble was led by violinist Max Krause from 1903 to 1917.

The orchestra's activity was interrupted during the final years of the First World War and resumed in 1919 under the direction of Paul Richter, who also initiated regional tours. In 1924, in cooperation with the Sibiu Musical Society, the Brașov Philharmonic Society organised a classical-music festival, followed by further editions in 1926 and 1927. During the economic crisis of the 1930s, the institution continued its activity on a reduced basis. From 1936 to 1944, the Philharmonic Society was led by Viktor Bickerich, organist of the Black Church and a teacher at the Johannes Honterus High School.

In parallel with the Philharmonic Society, the Romanian Philharmonic Society was founded in 1941 by professor and conductor Dinu Niculescu and a group of Romanian musicians. On 2 September 1945 it became the Romanian Philharmonic Association of Brașov, with composer Tiberiu Brediceanu as president; its inaugural concert took place on 15 June 1945 under Niculescu's direction. In October 1945, the orchestra's name was changed to the Gheorghe Dima Philharmonic Association.

After the Second World War, Dinu Niculescu reorganised the orchestra as a symphonic ensemble. During the following decades, the institution developed symphonic and chamber concerts, educational concerts for children and tours within Romania. In the 1960s and 1970s, the orchestra was associated with conductors Ilarion Ionescu-Galați and Mircea Lucescu, as well as with the soloist Liviu Teodor Teclu.

Ilarion Ionescu-Galați, who led the institution between 1973 and 1986, was associated with the international development of both the symphony orchestra and the chamber orchestra. He initiated the Dinu Niculescu International Conducting Competition and founded the International Chamber Music Festival, first held in 1970. The festival continued for 30 consecutive editions and later periodically; by 2024 it had reached its 43rd edition.

In the post-1990 period, the orchestra continued its activity in Brașov under several managers and conductors. Ovidiu Dan Chirilă, permanent conductor and director of the institution from 1996 to 2004, was associated with the renewal of the symphony orchestra and the resumption of educational concert cycles. Stela Drăgulin served as general director from January 2005 for approximately two years, and Cecilia Doiciu, director between 2007 and 2010, was involved in the project for the rehabilitation of the Patria building, later used as the orchestra's main concert hall.

The renovated Patria Hall (Romanian: Sala Patria) became the Philharmonic's main venue after refurbishment work on the former Patria cinema building. The Philharmonic's current activities include symphonic concerts, chamber concerts, recitals and educational programmes.

From 2017 to 2020 the symphony orchestra was led by cellist Anton Niculescu. In September 2020, pianist Ioan Dragoș Dimitriu became director of the Philharmonic. During this period the orchestra expanded its activity in public spaces in Brașov and undertook an international tour with violinist Maxim Vengerov in the United Kingdom in 2022.

In October 2023, concertmaster Sebastian Tegzeșiu became interim manager of the institution. On 9 April 2024 the orchestra performed Beethoven's Ninth Symphony in the Großer Saal of the Berliner Philharmonie, under the direction of Daisuke Soga, in a concert marking 200 years since the work's premiere.

== Guest artists and collaborators ==
The Brașov Philharmonic has appeared with a range of conductors, soloists and chamber musicians. Historical guests and artists associated with the Brașov Philharmonic Society included Joseph Joachim, Johannes Brahms, Richard Strauss, Felix Weingartner, George Enescu, Edwin Fischer and Joseph Prunner.

In later periods, conductors and artists associated with the institution have included Ilarion Ionescu-Galați, Mircea Lucescu, Dinu Niculescu, Ovidiu Dan Chirilă, Anton Niculescu, Cristian Oroșanu, Horia Mihail, Alexandru Tomescu, Răzvan Popovici, Eduard Kunz, Daisuke Soga, Radu Postăvaru, Sergey Smbatyan, Maxim Vengerov and Nayden Todorov.

As the Romanian National Philharmonic Orchestra, the ensemble appeared at Cadogan Hall in London in 2022 with violinist Maxim Vengerov and conductor Sergey Smbatyan in a programme including works by Sibelius, Alexey Shor, Prokofiev and Tchaikovsky. In 2024, the orchestra performed Beethoven's Ninth Symphony at the Berliner Philharmonie with conductor Daisuke Soga, soprano Alessia Schumacher, contralto Flaka Goranci, tenor Benjamin Glaubitz, bass Oscar Hillebrandt and the German-Japanese Choir.
