= Therese Schaeffer =

19th century German composer

Therese Schäffer was a 19th-century German composer who wrote music for orchestra, piano and voice. Little is known about her life and education, but she composed works through at least opus 27 which were published by Carl Paez (active 1842–1900) and Adolf Martin Schlesinger (active 1810–1838). Her compositions included:

== Orchestra ==
- Festival Overture

== Piano ==
- Capriccio, opus 16
- Etincelles
- Lamentations Erotique, opus 1
- Mazurka, opus 5
- Nocturne, opus 15
- Rondo Brilliant, opus 14
- Scherzo, opus 17
- Serenade, opus 27

== Vocal ==
- Cradle Song, opus 22
- Fourteen songs (collection)
- Two Songs, opus 6
- Two Songs, opus 7
