= Adolf Bernhard Marx =

German music theorist, critic, and musicologist

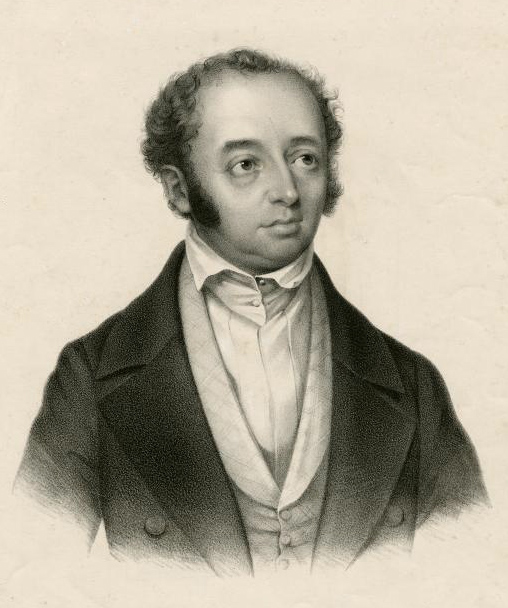
- Marx in 1826
- Born: 15 May 1795; Halle
- Died: 17 May 1866 (aged 71); Berlin
- Occupations: Music theorist; critic; pedagogue
- Known for: Codification of sonata form; Beethoven scholarship

Academic work
- Discipline: Music theory; music criticism
- Institutions: Berlin University; Stern Conservatory

Signature
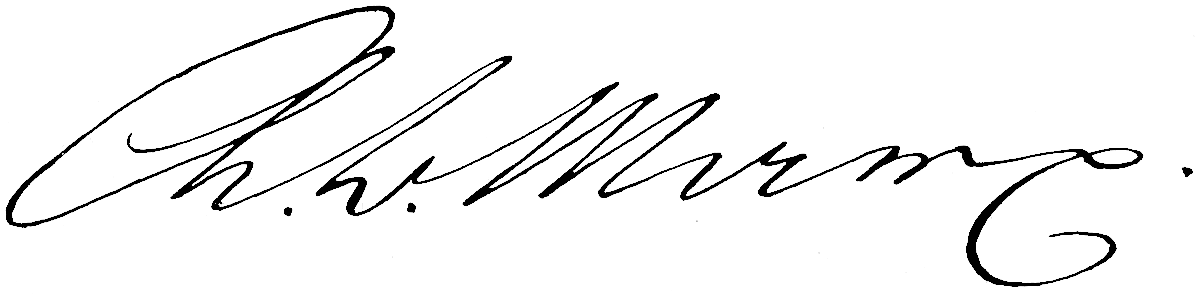

Friedrich Heinrich Adolf Bernhard Marx, also known as A. B. Marx (15 May 1795 – 17 May 1866), was a German music theorist, critic, and pedagogue. Described by Grove Music Online as "one of the most influential theorists of the 19th century", he was a Professor of Music at Berlin University from 1830 until his death; he also helped found the Stern Conservatory in 1850. Marx is best known for standardizing the analysis of sonata form, his championship of Ludwig van Beethoven, and his promotion of music education.

== Life and career ==
Friedrich Heinrich Adolf Bernhard Marx was born on 15 May 1795 in Halle. His father, though a Jewish doctor and a member of the congregation, was according to his son a convinced atheist. Marx was given the names Samuel Moses at birth, but changed these at his baptism in 1819.

He began his career studying law at University of Halle, but also learned musical composition there—a fellow student was the composer Carl Loewe. After rejecting an offer for legal appointment at Naumburg, in 1821 he went to Berlin, where in 1825 Adolf Martin Schlesinger appointed him editor of the music journal he had founded, the Berliner allgemeine musikalische Zeitung. Marx's intellectual critiques were appreciated by, amongst others, Beethoven, although they often offended the Berlin establishment, including Carl Friedrich Zelter.

Marx became an intimate of the family of Felix Mendelssohn, who was greatly influenced by Marx's ideas about the representational qualities of music—Marx's influence in the revision of Mendelssohn's overture to 'A Midsummer Night's Dream' (1826) was noted by their mutual friend Eduard Devrient in his memoirs. After Mendelssohn's revival of J. S. Bach's St. Matthew Passion in 1829, Marx persuaded Schlesinger to undertake the publication of this work, making Bach's masterpiece accessible to scholars for the first time. As Mendelssohn matured however the two drifted apart. At one time each agreed to write the libretto for an oratorio to be composed by the other. Mendelssohn wrote a text on the subject of Moses, while Marx wrote one on the subject of St. Paul. However Mendelssohn's later oratorio on St. Paul used an extensively revised text; and when Marx asked Mendelssohn to perform his Moses in 1841 in Leipzig, Mendelssohn refused because of its poor quality. The enraged Marx thereupon threw his extensive correspondence with Mendelssohn into the river, and it has therefore been lost forever. Moses was to be performed by Liszt at Weimar in 1853.

In 1830, with Mendelssohn's recommendation, Marx was appointed to the new post of professor of music at Berlin University and, from this time until his death, Marx's main influence was as a writer and teacher. In 1832, he also became music director at the university. In 1850 he was one of the founders of the Berlin Stern conservatory. His four-volume textbook on compositional theory, Die Lehre von der musikalischen Komposition, was one of the most influential of the nineteenth century. It demonstrated a new approach to musical pedagogics, and presented a logically ordered system of the musical forms then in use, concluding with sonata form, which Marx exemplified using Beethoven's piano sonatas. Toward the end of his life Marx completed a biography of the composer. He wrote extensively about the music of his time and also published a two-volume autobiography.

== Selected writings ==
- Über Malerei in der Tonkunst: ein Maigruss an die Kunstphilosophen. Berlin, 1826.
- Die Lehre von der musikalischen Komposition, praktisch-theoretisch. Leipzig, 1837/38/45/47.
- Die Musik des neunzehnten Jahrhunderts und ihre Pflege: Methode der Musik. Leipzig, 1855.
- Ludwig van Beethoven: Leben und Schaffen. Berlin: Janke, 1859.
- Erinnerungen aus meinem Leben. Berlin, 1865.
- Musical Form in the Age of Beethoven: Selected Writings on Theory and Method. Edited and Translated by Scott Burnham. Cambridge: Cambridge University Press, 1997.
