= Oxford Philharmonic Orchestra =

English orchestra

- Orchestra
- Founded: 1998
- Concert hall: Sheldonian Theatre
- Concertmaster: Tamás András & Carmine Lauri
- Music director: Marios Papadopoulos
- Website: Official website

The Oxford Philharmonic Orchestra is a British professional symphony orchestra based in Oxford and is the Orchestra in Residence at the University of Oxford. It was founded in 1998 by Marios Papadopoulos as the Oxford Philomusica and was renamed the Oxford Philharmonic Orchestra in 2015.

They work regularly with many classical artists such as Maxim Vengerov, Martha Argerich, Sir András Schiff, and Sir Bryn Terfel. The current composer-in-residence for the 2024-26 period is Alexey Shor.

The orchestra's royal patron is Princess Alexandra.

== See also ==
- Oxford Symphony Orchestra
