= Adolf Martin Schlesinger =

German music publisher

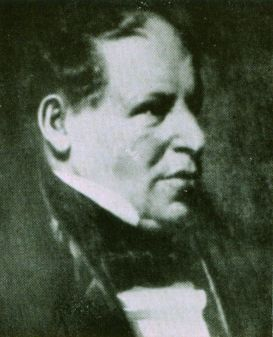
Adolf Martin Schlesinger, c. 1810

Adolf Martin Schlesinger (4 October 1769 – 11 October 1838) was a German music publisher whose firm became one of the most influential in Berlin in the early nineteenth century.

== Career ==
Schlesinger was Jewish, and was born Aaron Moses Schlesinger in Biała, Silesia. He began in the book business in Berlin in 1795, operating from his house and founded a music publishing house there, the Schlesinger'sche Buchhandlung, in 1810, initially situated in Breite Strasse. The firm expanded over the next decade to include composers such as Ludwig van Beethoven, Felix Mendelssohn, and Carl Maria von Weber. It also published military music for the Prussian state.

Schlesinger's ongoing lobbying on the issue of musical copyright (prompted by copyright infringement of his publication of Weber's Der Freischütz), was a major factor in the introduction of the influential Prussian copyright law of 1837. The prosperity of the business enabled the firm to move in 1823 to spacious premises at no. 34, Unter den Linden, where the mahogany fittings were designed by the architect Karl Friedrich Schinkel.

A contemporary description of Schlesinger represents him as 'a short, stout, portly gentleman, whose energy, entrepreneurial spirit and business sense one immediately noticed when he fixed one with his single eye (the left one was missing).'

In 1824 Schlesinger launched a music magazine, the Berliner allgemeine musikalische Zeitung, with Adolf Bernhard Marx as editor. On Marx's advice, he undertook the first publication of J. S. Bach's St. Matthew Passion after Mendelssohn's pioneering revival of the work (from manuscript sources) in 1829.

Schlesinger's Jewish origins led to slighting references about him by some other publishers and contemporary composers. Schlesinger was characterised by Beethoven in his correspondence as 'a beach-peddler and rag-and-bone Jew'; and Beethoven complained in a letter to the publisher Peters in 1826 that 'Schlesinger [..] has paid me a dirty Jewish trick'. Peters had previously asked Beethoven not to offer Schlesinger his Missa Solemnis, because 'a Christian Mass composed by Beethoven cannot come into the hands of a Jew, and especially such a Jew.' Despite these comments, Beethoven was perfectly happy for Schlesinger to publish, subsequently, his late quartets and sonatas.

Schlesinger also published music by Luigi Cherubini, Johann Nepomuk Hummel, Carl Loewe, Theresa Schaeffer, Gaspare Spontini, Else Streit, and others.

== Death and succession to the firm ==
Schlesinger died in Berlin in 1838, leaving his widow a substantial fortune.

Schlesinger's son Moritz Adolf (Maurice) Schlesinger later started a branch of the firm in Paris, and another son, Heinrich, took over the Berlin branch and sold it to Robert Lienau in 1864.

The Paris firm became a leader of musical taste, publishing the music of Chopin, Liszt, and Meyerbeer among others. It also published the principal Paris musical magazine, the Revue et gazette musicale. The composer Richard Wagner worked for Maurice Schlesinger in Paris in 1840-41, turning out hack arrangements of opera excerpts. Wagner's autobiography pointedly refers to Maurice Schlesinger's Jewish origins.
