= Stephan Krehl =

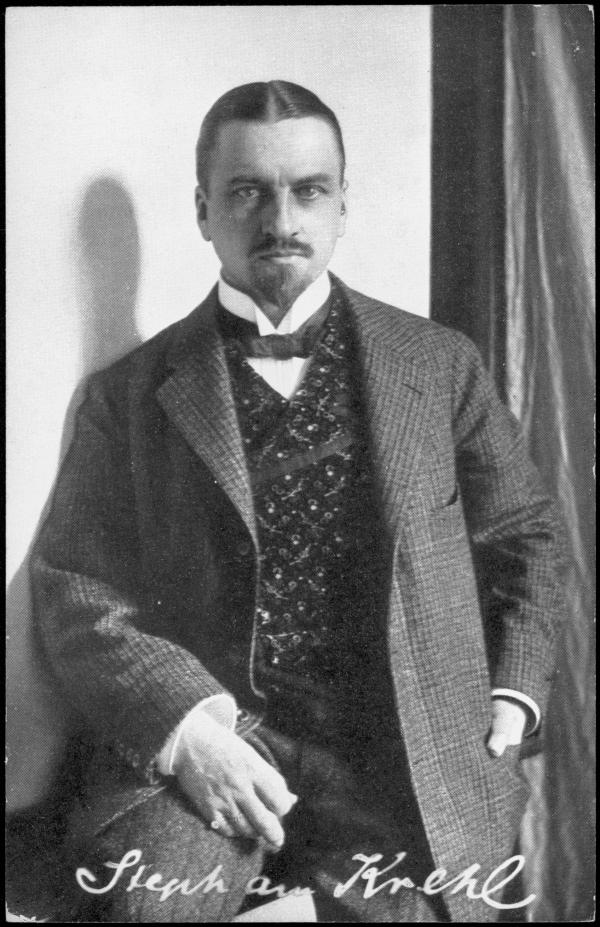
Stephan Krehl

Stephan Krehl (5 July 1864 – 9 April 1924) was a German composer, teacher, and theoretician. His writings include Traité général de la musique and Théorie de la musique et de science de la composition. His pupils included Didia Saint Georges, Pablo Sorozábal, Maurice Besly, and Else Streit.

== Works ==
- String Quartet in A major, Op.17 (published and performed 1899)
- Quintet for Clarinet and Strings in A major, Op.19
- Piano Trio in D major, Op.32
- Cello concerto in G minor, Op.37 (performed February 2, 1911)
