= Alexey Shor =

American composer

Background information
- Genres: Classical music
- Occupation: Music composer
- Labels: Warner Classics, DECCA, Sony Classics, Delos, Berlin Classics, Melodiya, Denon, Pentatone
- Website: alexeyshor.com

Alexey Shor (born Alexey Vladimorovich Kononenko (Note: Ukrainian: Олексій Володимирович Кононенко, romanized: Oleksii Volodymyrovych Kononenko) in 1970) is an American composer. He is the Composer-in-Residence for the Armenian State Symphony Orchestra and was an associate composer at the Yehudi Menuhin School. In 2018 he was awarded an honorary professorship at the Yerevan Komitas State Conservatory. He is the Oxford Philharmonic Orchestra’s Composer-in-Residence for the 2024–2028 seasons.

== Early life and mathematics career ==
Alexey Shor was born on 20 May 1970 in the Ukrainian SSR (now Ukraine). His mother is a programmer, and his father is a physicist at the Kyiv Polytechnic Institute. In 1991, he left the Soviet Union for Israel with his parents. He later moved to the United States, where he continued his graduate studies in mathematics at the Pennsylvania State University. Shor’s research focused on billiards, dynamical systems, Lie groups, and non-Euclidean geometry. In 1996, he obtained a PhD in mathematics. He was then offered a position at the University of Pennsylvania, an Ivy League university. From 1999 to 2016, he worked in the field of statistical modeling and algorithmic financial theory, and in quantitative research for the Long Island hedge fund Renaissance Technologies.

== Composer career ==
From 2012, Shor began composing short pieces as a hobby, until violist David Aaron Carpenter came across one of his scores. Carpenter began performing Shor’s works at his concerts, and videos of these performances went viral. The composer eventually wrote more than 20 pieces for Carpenter.

Shor wrote his first violin concerto in 2014, and in 2016 he left finance to pursue composition full-time. In 2018, the Komitas Conservatory in Armenia awarded him the title of honorary professor. During the 2022–2023 season, he worked as an associate composer at the Yehudi Menuhin School.

The composer’s works have been released by Warner Classics, Sony Classical, DECCA (Universal), Naxos, DENON, Pentatone, and have been performed at many venues, including Wiener Musikverein, Carnegie Hall, the Kimmel Center in Philadelphia, the Berlin Philharmonie, Kennedy Center, the Concertgebouw, the Gasteig, Wigmore Hall, and the Teatro Argentina (Rome), amongst many others. The overture to his ballet "Crystal Palace" was performed at the 40th Gramophone Classical Music Awards event in London. In 2018 and 2025, Medici.tv aired two documentaries about Alexey.

The composer's works have been performed at the Verbier Festival, the InClassica Festival, the Malta International Music Festival, Wandering Music Stars, and the Eurasian Stars International Festival. Shor composed the soundtrack for the 2021 film Blood on the Crown, which won Best Musical Score at the Malta Film Festival.

From 2024-2028 Shor is serving as Composer-in-Residence of the Oxford Philharmonic Orchestra.
