= Oxford University Jazz Society =

Logo of the Oxford University Jazz Society

The Oxford University Jazz Society, also known as JazzSoc, is the focus of jazz music at the University of Oxford, England; the place to be for players and listeners, dancers and drinkers. Formerly known as the Oxford University Jazz Club, the society now provides the main arena for student players to interact musically, whilst also encouraging a non-student contingent.

== History ==
The music critic Peter Gammond (born 1925) was involved with the band that formed the original Oxford University Jazz Club. The conductor, composer, and pianist Samuel Hogarth has studied the early history of the Club.

In 1951, the Club held meetings in St Michael's Hall every Saturday at 8 pm. This consisted of two sessions of live Jazz presented by the Club's musicians, a record interlude, and often a recital by a guest soloist. In 1953, the club started to hold its meetings on alternate Fridays in the Green Room of the Kemp Restaurant where the Club's resident band would perform. The writer and documentary maker Tony Cash played clarinet and saxophone in the Club's band and became its President during the 1950s.

In the 1960s, there were two different jazz clubs at the University: the larger Oxford University Jazz Club, which met at the Carfax Assembly Rooms and had dancing, and the OU Modern Jazz Club which met in seated venues at the Wheatsheaf Inn on the High Street, founded by the saxophonist, clarinetist and composer Bill Ashton (born 1936).

The columnist and bass player Miles Kington, then a trombonist, was a musical organiser of the Modern Jazz Club in Trinity Term 1962. He refused membership of the Club to Nigel Tully, founder of the Dark Blues band, because of his love of Buddy Holly's music. Performers in the Michaelmas Term 1962 included Dickie Hawdon(trumpet), Alan and Jimmy Skidmore, and the Fat John Band.

In 1963, the OU Jazz Club started the Big Night, initiated by Marcus Wigan on the OU Jazz Club Committee, and hired the entire Johnny Dankworth Big Band for what was a significant financial risk. The controlled capacity of the Carfax Assembly Rooms was strictly observed, and counters were allocated to check people in and out of the dance and performance hall itself during the evening to maintain these numbers. To the regret of the organisers, with a good profit in a queue extending well back through Carfax, the University Proctors arrived and stopped any more tickets being sold. Shortly after Marcus Wigan presented a large cheque for the Big Night, John Dankworth gave a talk to the very different Modern Jazz Club (where Wigan was also on the Committee): the Pat Crumly Quartet, the Ronnie Ross plus Trio and Art Themen plus the Pat Crumly Quartet all presented.

In the 1970s, the OU Jazz Club organised weekly gigs in the first floor of the former Roebuck public house in Market Street, central Oxford, presenting well-known British jazz musicians such as Lol Coxhill, Harry Beckett, Alan Skidmore, Don Rendell, Art Themen, Kenny Wheeler and Barbara Thompson as well as Oxford-based jazz bands including Pat Crumly's 'Edge' and the Oxcentrics.

After a period of inactivity in the 1980s, in 1994, the OU Modern Jazz Club was reformed as the Jazz Society and is now colloquially known as "JazzSoc". Between 1994 and 1997, it hosted a weekly jam session at Po Na Na on St Giles'; from 1997 to 2004 the session was once again at the Wheatsheaf pub on the High Street, where the jam session regularly attracted an audience of up to 100 students.

In 2004, JazzSoc returned to its original home at the Roebuck, known until 2006 as the 'Market Tavern' (after then it was transformed into a 'Wagamama' restaurant). From 2006 until 2008, JazzSoc took place at the 'Blue Bar' in the cellar of the Cock and Camel pub on George Street. This has also since transformed into a restaurant and is now owned by Jamie Oliver. In 2008, the society briefly held its jams at the Purple Turtle bar, before having no fixed venue for a short period during which the jams were held in various college bars on various days, depending on availability. At the end of 2008 the jam eventually settled at the 'Thirst Lodge', before another change in 2009 to Bar Copa in George Street. During this period the weekly event consisted of a set performed by a house band of student musicians before opening the stage for a jam. However, once a term JazzSoc presented a 'spectacular' featuring an internationally renowned jazz act, playing either with their own band or with a local rhythm section. Past spectaculars featured Nigel Hitchcock, Soweto Kinch, Julian Arguelles, and Jim Mullen.

As of October 2013, the jam ran every Tuesday night at The Mad Hatter. At this time JazzSoc began to host professional acts weekly during term. In addition, student bands hosting the jam began to more often be less-established student ensembles rather than a house band.

== Events ==
JazzSoc runs a weekly jam at The Mad Hatter on Iffley Road, Oxford. The jam typically opens with a house band set featuring either an up-and-coming jazz ensemble, student or otherwise, or a more widely renowned professional artist. The floor is then opened to everyone and anyone with a desire to jam.

Notable performances have included Escape Hatch (Ivo Neame, Andrea Di Biase, Dave Hamblett), Adam Waldmann (of MOBO winning Kairos 4Tet), Gareth Lockrane, David Newton, Tina May, the BBC Young Jazz Musician of the Year 2014 winner Alex Bone, Nigel Price, Binker Golding on his debut album release tour, Rob Luft, Waaju, Nihilism, Brother's Testament, and more.

JazzSoc primarily sends information about its events to its members via its Facebook page "JazzSoc – Oxford University" and its mailing list, hosted by the Oxford University IT services.

As of 2020, JazzSoc replenished its membership card supplies due to large demand, and launched a record label to give student bands the opportunity to produce and release their music on digital platforms.

== See also ==
- Oxford University Jazz Orchestra
- Oxford University Big Band

== Bibliography ==
- "Article". Jazz Journal International. Billboard Limited: 7. 2004.
