= Eduard Hayrapetyan =

Armenian composer

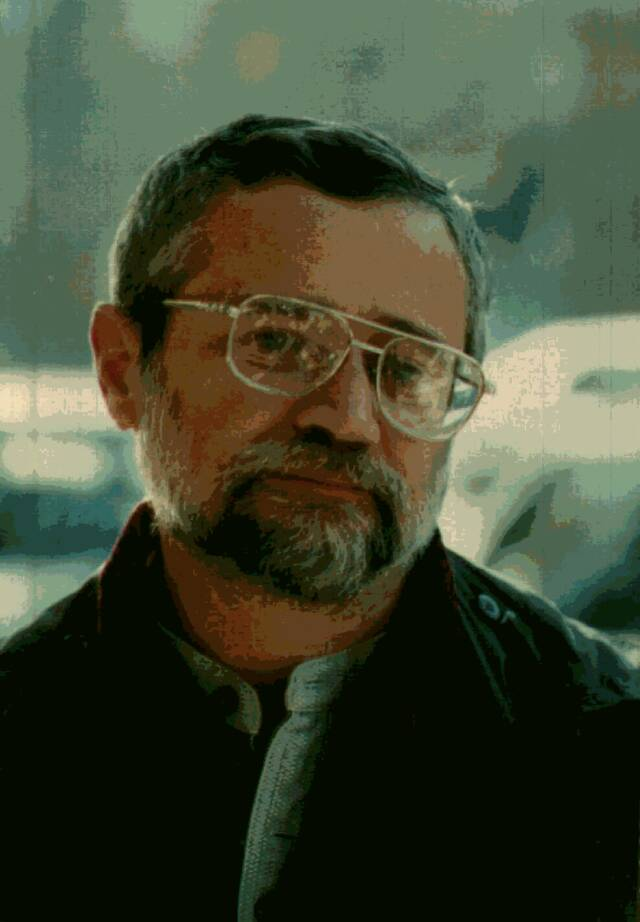
Eduard Hayrapetyan

Eduard Hayrapetyan (Armenian: Էդուարդ Հայրապետյան; born September 5, 1949) is an Armenian composer of contemporary classical music and educator.

== Biography ==
He was born in Yerevan, Armenia, on September 5, 1949. He first studied composition at the Melikian Music College under Grigor Akhinian (1966–68) and then under Grigor Yeghiazarian at the Yerevan Komitas State Conservatory (1968–73). He joined the Armenian Composers Union in 1976.

Hayrapetyan's musical style is characterized by a blend of traditional Armenian motifs and modern compositional techniques. His works often incorporate elements of Armenian folk musice. Despite this traditional influence, Hayrapetyan's compositions are noted for their innovative approach to harmony, rhythm, and orchestration.

Throughout his career, Hayrapetyan has been a prolific composer, producing a wide range of works across various genres. In addition to his concertos, he has composed symphonies, chamber music, and vocal works.

In addition to his work as a composer, Hayrapetyan is also an educator, having taught composition at the Komitas State Conservatory of Yerevan for many years. He has mentored numerous young composers, passing on his knowledge and passion for music to the next generation.

Hayrapetyan's impact on Armenian music extends beyond his compositions and teaching. He has been instrumental in promoting Armenian music on the international stage, collaborating with musicians and ensembles from around the world to showcase Armenian music.

Among Hayrapetyan's major works are the ballet “Tram “Wish”, 1991, (after T.Williams “A Street Car Named Desire”); Three Symphonies (1985, 1987, 2000); “Oratorio-1915” (documentary texts) for speaker, soloists, chorus and symphony orchestra (1977); Concertos for: Violin(7); Viola(3); Cello(3); Flute; Oboe; Clarinet; Bassoon; Double Concerto for Violin and Viola; Percussion; String Quartets(5); Works for Chorus; Cycles of Songs based on poems by Byron, Eichendorff, George, Rilke, Metsarentz, Hakob Mowses, Trakl as well as Sonatas for various instruments.

== World Premieres during 1998–2009 ==
- Symphony No.3 “The Big Fiery Butterfly” for the full Symphony orchestra, 2000, 53’30", performed by Armenian Philharmonic Orchestra, 2001
- “The Lost Balloon” for chamber string orchestra, 1998, 15', performed by National Chamber Orchestra of Armenia (NCOA), 1998
- “From Afar” for duduk and chamber string orchestra, 1999, 17', performed by NCOA, 2000
- “With Ecstasy...” for mixed chorus and chamber string orchestra (words by Misak Metsarents, in Armenian), 2001, 15', performed by Armenian Chamber Choir and NCOA, 2003
- Concerto No3 “Avetum”(“Annunciation”) for cello and chamber string orchestra, 2004, 30', performed by “Naregatsi” Chamber Music Society, 2008
- Double Concerto for violin, viola and chamber string orchestra,1997, 27’, performed by "Alan Hovhannes Chamber Orchestra", 2007
- String quartet #4 “Theater music”, 1994, 17’30", performed by “Harmonies of the World” Ukraine, 2005
- “I tell thee, minstrel, I must weep...” song cycle for voice and 10 instruments (words by George Gordon Byron, in English), 1990, 23’, performed by Collegium Musicum Armenicum, 2002
- “Artun” (“The Awakening”) for soprano, piano and chamber string orchestra (words by Misak Metsarents, in Armenian), 1998, 8’, performed by NCOA, 2000
- “Narzis” Chamber Symphony, 2008, 31’13", performed by “Alan Hovhannes” Chamber Orchestra, 2008
- “To Be” Three Poems for mixed chorus (words by Misak Metsarents, in Armenian, 1.Irikune (The Evening), 2.Hove (The Breeze), 3.Hyughe (The Sanctuary), 2006, 20’, performed by Armenian Chamber Choir, 2008

== Compositions ==
Ballet:

“Tram “Wish” after T. Williams “A Street Car Named Desire” in 2 acts, 1991, 60’

Orchestral:

- Symphony #1, 1985, 28’30",
- Symphony #2, 1987, 27',
- Symphony #3, “The Big Fiery Butterfly”, 2000, 53’30",
- “Narcissus” Chamber Symphony, 1978, 20’, Rev. 2008, 31’13",
- “The River” (after T.S. Eliot) for symphony orchestra, 1994, 13’,
- “Theater Music” for chamber string orchestra, 1996, 17’30",
- “The Lost Balloon” for chamber string orchestra, 1998,15’,
- “From Afar” for duduk & chamber string orchestra, 1999, 17’

Choral:

- “Oratorio-1915” (documentary texts) for speaker, mezzo, bass, mixed chorus and symphony orchestra (in Armenian), 1977, 38’
- “Seven peaceful words” Cantata for mixed chorus (words by Hakob Movses, in Armenian), 1991, 14’
- “Our Father” for mixed chorus (in Armenian), 1998, 5’
- “With Ecstasy...” for mixed chorus and chamber string orchestra (words by Misak Metsarents, in Armenian), 2001, 15’
- “Intimate Visions” Two choral songs (words by Misak Metsarents, in Armenian), 7', for children chorus, 2002, for mixed chorus, 2004
- “To Be” Three Poems for mixed chorus (words by Misak Metsarents, in Armenian), 2006, 20’

Concertos:

- Concerto for flute and chamber string orchestra, 1984, 17’30"
- Concerto for oboe and chamber orchestra, 1992, 18’
- Concerto for clarinet and chamber orchestra, 1991, 17’
- Concerto for bassoon and chamber orchestra, 1994, 18’
- Concerto #1 for violin and chamber string orchestra, 1976–1980, 14’
- Concerto #2 for violin and chamber string orchestra, 1980, 17’30"
- Concerto #3 for violin and chamber orchestra, 1983, 22’
- Concerto #4 for violin and symphony orchestra, 1986, 26’
- Concerto #5 for violin and chamber orchestra, 1989, 27’
- Concerto #6 for violin and chamber string orchestra, 1995, 22’
- Concerto #7 for violin and chamber string orchestra, 2008, 22'
- Concerto #1 for viola and chamber string orchestra, 1983, Rev. 1995, 20’20"
- Concerto #2 for viola and symphony orchestra, 1993, 28’
- Concerto #3 for viola and chamber string orchestra, 2008, 25’
- Concerto #1 for cello and symphony orchestra, 1981, 18’
- Concerto #2 for cello and chamber orchestra, 1986, 20’
- Concerto #3 “Avetum”(“Annunciation”) for cello and chamber string orchestra,1993,19’Rev. 2004,30’
- Double Concerto for violin, viola and chamber string orchestra, 1997, 27’
- “Marimba and Timpani” Concerto for percussion and chamber string orchestra, 2006, 20’

Chamber instrumental:

- String quartet #1, 1983, 12’
- String quartet #2, 1988, 18’
- String quartet #3 “Quartet of Dreams”, 1992, 18’
- String quartet #4 “Theater music”, 1994, 17’30"
- String quartet #5, 2008, 20’
- Trio for violin, flute and clarinet, 1981, Rev. 2003, 12’
- Quartet for violin, viola, cello and piano, 1981, Rev. 1998, 18’
- Suite for flute, five groups percussion and piano, 1976, 22’
- “Konzertstucke” for chamber ensemble, 1982, 10’
- “Triad” for piano, 1970, 7’
- “Intervals” for piano, 1973, 10’
- Sonatina for violins ensemble, 1974, 10’
- “Five pieces” for violin and piano, 1977, 5’30"
- “Five pieces” for wind quintet, 1978, 5’
- “Fantasy” for violin solo, 1979, 9’
- “The obtained song” for viola solo, 1993, 7’
- “Dialogue” for violin and piano, 1995, 9’30"
- “Above the Hills” for cello solo, 2000, 6’
- “Postskriptum” for flute solo, 2004, 8
- “Meeting” for two contrabasses, 2005, 7’

Sonatas:

- Sonata for flute and piano, 2005, 15’
- Sonata for oboe and piano, 2005, 12’
- Sonata for clarinet and piano, 2005, 21’
- Sonata for bassoon and piano, 2005, 15’
- Sonata for piano, 1979, 14’
- Sonata #1 for violin and piano, 1972, 12’
- Sonata #2 for violin and piano, 1980, 12’
- Sonata #3 for violin and piano, 1982, 13’30"
- Sonata #4 for violin and piano, 1992, 14’
- Sonata for violin solo, 2004, 10’
- Sonata for two violins and piano, 1988, 13’
- Sonata #1 for viola and piano, 1980, 13’30"
- Sonata #2 for viola and piano, 1983, 14’
- Sonata #3 for viola and piano, 1986, 14’
- Sonata #4 for viola and piano, 2006, 19’50"
- Sonata #1 for cello and piano, 1980, 12’
- Sonata #2 for cello and piano, 1984, 16’
- Sonata for cello solo, 1993, Rev.2000, 12’

Vocal:

- “Moon Sign” solo cantata for voice and piano (words by Roman Kim, in Russian), 1981, 12’
- “...nur ein kurzes Trennen” song cycle for voice and 13 instruments (words by Joseph von Eichendorff, in German), 1989, 26’
- “I tell thee, minstrel, I must weep...” song cycle for voice and 10 instruments (words by George Gordon Byron, in English), 1990, 23’
- “Der geheime Sternenfall” song cycle for soprano and string quartet (words by Reiner Maria Rilke, in German), 1990, 12’
- “...This twilight's pearl-shade” three songs for soprano and piano (words by Misak Metsarents, in Armenian), 1993, 10’
- “Artun” (“The Awakenning”) for soprano, piano and chamber string orchestra (words by Misak Metsarents, in Armenian), 1998, 8’
- “Yuli – Schwermut” three songs for soprano and piano (words by Stefan George, in German), 2003, 11’
- “Der heilige Fremdling” song cycle for voice and piano (words by Georg Trakl, in German), 2008, 15’

== Sources ==
- S. Sarkisian: ‘O tvorchestve molodikh kompositorov Armenii’ (On the creative work of young Armenian composers), Muzikal’naya kul’tura bratskich respublik SSSR, ed. G.Kon’kova, Vol. I (Kiev, 1982), pp. 147–67
- B. Banas: ‘Muzika ormianska’ Trybuna polska (12 November 1986)
- A. Arevshatyan: ‘Muzika dlya kamerno-orkestrovikh sostavov: 70-80-e godi (Music for chamber and orchestral casts: the 70s-80s), Armyanskoye iskusstvo na sovremenom etape, ed. G.Geodakyan (Yerevan, 1987), pp.157-8
- S. Sarkisian: ‘Mlodzi kompozytorzy Armenii’ (The young composers of Armenia), Ruch muzyczny, no.8 (Warszawa,1987), pp. 18–19
- S. Sarkisian: ‘Nostal’gicheskiy romantism Eduarda Ayrapetyana’ (Eduard Hayrapetian's nostalgic romanticism), Muzikal’naya academia, no.2 (Moscow, 2000), pp. 49–51
- A. Arevshatyan: ‘Egherne ev hay ardi erazhshtoutyoune’ (The Genocide and Contemporary Armenian Music), Erazhshtakan Hayastan N2 (17) 2005
- M. Rukhkian: ‘Ritsar instrumental, nogo kontserta‘ (Kniqht of instrumental concerto), Golos Armenii (9 July 2009)
