= Armen Smbatian =

Armenian diplomat

Armen Bagrati Smbatyan (Armenian: Արմեն Բագրատի Սմբատյան) is an Armenian diplomat and a former Ambassador of Armenia to Russia.

== Life and career ==
Armen Smbatyan was born in 1954 in Yerevan. From 1974 to 1980, Smbatyan studied at the Yerevan Komitas State Conservatory in the class of piano. From 1977 to 1981 Smbatyan studied at the Composition and Music Theory Department of the same Conservatory, where he also attended post-graduation course (1982-1985). From 1978 to 1980 Smbatyan took courses on “Composition and Music Theory” specialty at the Moscow P.I. Tchaikovsky State Conservatory.

From 1981 to 1988 Smbatyan was a tutor at the Music Theory Department of the Yerevan Komitas State Conservatory. Later, from 1988 to 1992, he has been an associate professor in the same institution and in 1992 was granted the title of professor. From 1988 to 1994 Smbatyan has been appointed the Vice Rector of the Yerevan Komitas State Conservatory. From 1982 to 1987 Smbatyan held the position of General Director of the RA Public Television Radio Company's Musical programs. In 1987 Smbatyan was awarded the title of RA Honored Worker of Art. From 1995 to 2002 he has been the Rector of the Yerevan Komitas State Conservatory. From 1996 to 1998 Smbatyan served as the RA Minister of Culture, Sports ant Youth Affairs. Since 1997 Smbatyan has been the President of the Armenian Society for Cultural Cooperation with Foreign Countries Non-Governmental Organization.

In 2001 on the decision of RA President Smbatyan was awarded Movses Khorenatsi medal. From 2002 to 2010 served as the Ambassador Extraordinary and Plenipotentiary of the RA to the Russian Federation. In 2003 Smbatyan was granted the diplomatic title of Ambassador Extraordinary and Plenipotentiary. From 2010 to 2014 he has been the executive director of the Intergovernmental Foundation for Educational, Scientific and Cultural Cooperation (IFESCCO).

The wide repertoire of the compositions by Smbatyan covers diverse genres: preludes, variations for piano, "Chaconne and Fugue" for piano trio, piano concerto, concerto for orchestra, symphonic poem, “Manuscript” symphony, music for cartoons and movies, “Lilith” television ballet, music for jazz orchestra and choir. From 2014 till now he is Advisor to the President of Republic Armenia.

== Arrest ==
In July 2023 he was arrested, along with his son for large scale fraud in Armenia.

== See also ==
- Embassy of Armenia in Moscow
