= Turnfurlong =

Area of Aylesbury, Buckinghamshire, England

Coordinates: 51.810117°N 0.795192°W

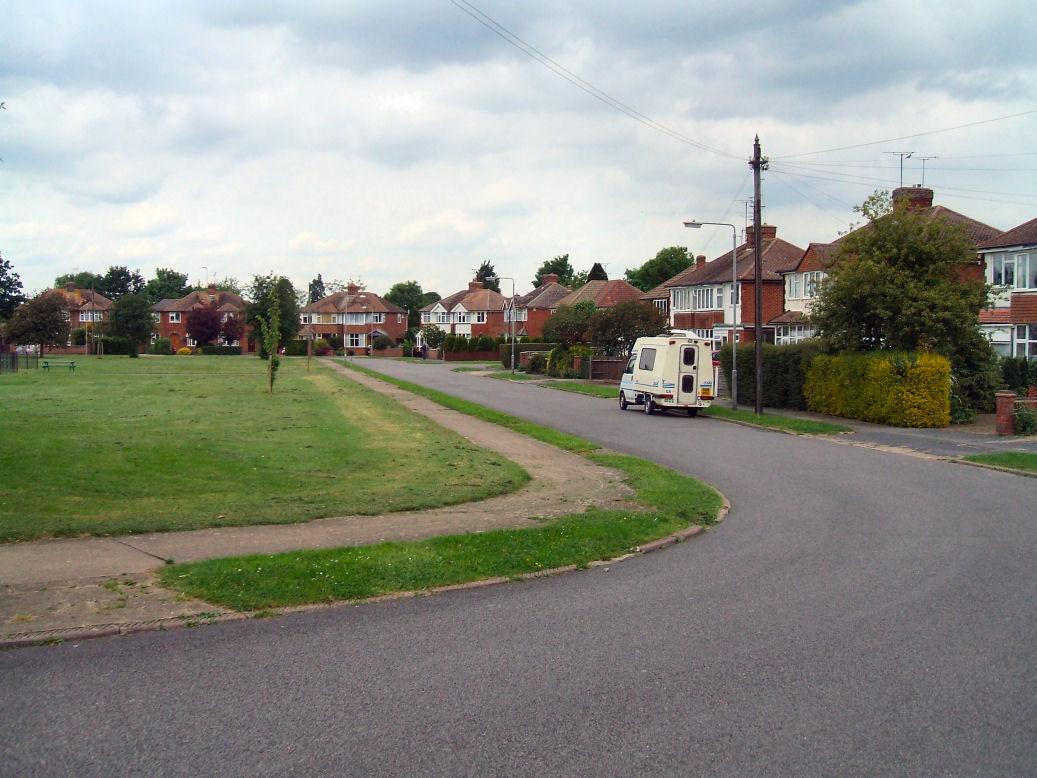
- Typical housing in Turnfurlong

- Location within Buckinghamshire
- OS grid reference: SP8313
- Civil parish: Aylesbury
- Unitary authority: Buckinghamshire
- Ceremonial county: Buckinghamshire
- Region: South East
- Country: England
- Sovereign state: United Kingdom
- Post town: AYLESBURY
- Postcode district: HP21
- Dialling code: 01296
- Police: Thames Valley
- Fire: Buckinghamshire
- Ambulance: South Central
- UK Parliament: Aylesbury

Turnfurlong (also known historically as Turn Furlong) is an area of Aylesbury (where at the 2011 Census the population was included) in Buckinghamshire, England. It is roughly defined as the area of housing that adjoins the two roads, Turnfurlong and Turnfurlong Lane (about a mile in combined length).

== History ==
Turnfurlong Lane originated as a farm track that linked Walton hamlet with Bedgrove Farm and there was a small farmstead part way along the track called Turnfurlong, roughly in the location of what is now the back of Aylesbury Grammar School. Within the first ten years of the 20th century the new grammar school and the adjoining town cemetery were in place on the edge of Walton hamlet, and it is at about this time that the farmstead of Turnfurlong disappeared from period maps.

Between the First World War and the Second World War Aylesbury was expanding in population and the stretch of Turnfurlong Lane between Walton and what is now Wendover Way was built up with three-bedroomed semi-detached family homes by the bookbinders Hazell, Watson and Viney for their employees. It is at about this time that the adjoining Fair Mile, Walton Way and Clinton Crescent were constructed for the same purpose.

Following the Second World War prefabs were sited temporarily on what is now King Edward Avenue and the Grange School and Aylesbury High School were both opened, though the latter is strictly within the boundary of Walton hamlet.

The latter part of Turnfurlong Lane was developed in stages between the 1960s and 1990s. Worthy of note are the development around Webster Road, built on the site of the old Aylesbury United football ground, the Foxhills development and the large Bedgrove development.

== Etymology ==
The origin of the name Turnfurlong is uncertain. A theory as to the origin of the name is that it was the boundary between two furlongs or fields, being the point where the plough needed to be turned, though there is no supporting evidence of this theory.

== Schools ==
The aforementioned Grange School is the only secondary school in the area, though there are four primary schools, two infant and two junior, in Turnfurlong.

Turnfurlong Infant School is a community school that takes children from ages 4 to 7. It has approximately 260 pupils. In 2008-2009 Turnfurlong Infant school, was given an 'Outstanding' rating in a school inspection. Its uniform is a white polo shirt with a red jumper with the school logo on it. The PTA is currently named FoTIS.

Turnfurlong Junior School is a community school that takes children from ages 7 to 11. It has approximately 350 pupils. Its uniform is a red jumper or fleece with a white shirt. Turnfurlong Junior School, has links with the Infant school, and often hosts activities together. It offers a wide range of clubs, such as Jazz Band, Wind band, Netball, Tag Rugby, Cross Country and many more. Students learn modern languages such as French.The schools PTA(Parent Teacher Association) is currently named FoTJS.

St Joseph's Catholic Infant School is a mixed Roman Catholic primary school. It was opened in 1971, when demand for spaces at RC schools in the area meant that the school on the adjacent site − what is now St Edward's Junior School − could no longer take children under the age of 7. St Joseph's is a voluntary aided infant school, which takes children from the age of 4 through to the age of 7. The school has approximately 200 pupils. The school is controlled by the Roman Catholic Diocese of Northampton and its motto is "I am special in God's eyes".

St Edward's Catholic Junior School is a mixed Roman Catholic voluntary aided junior school, which takes children from ages 7 to 11. It has approximately 240 pupils.
