= Bobby Worth (musician) =

British jazz drummer

- Birth name: Robert Dodsworth
- Born: 7 January 1949 (age 76); Bermondsey, London, England
- Genres: Jazz
- Occupation: Musician
- Instrument: Drums
- Years active: 1966-Present

Robert Dodsworth (January 7, 1949), better known as Bobby Worth, is a British jazz drummer. He was named the 1998 British Telecom Drummer of the Year.

== Biography ==
Worth started to play drums aged just 11 and became professional in 1966 aged just 17 as the first drummer for the National Youth Jazz Orchestra.

He has played with several big bands, including Frankie Vaughan's V men, the Bert Rhodes Orchestra, Kenny Baker's Dozen, the Freddy Staff Big Band, the BBC Radio Orchestra, the Stateside Stompers and the Buck Clayton Legacy Band.

Worth has played in trios and quartets led by Pete King, Jim Mullen, Don Weller, Brian Dee, Simon Spillett, Geoff Eales, Derek Nash, Alan Barnes and Digby Fairweather, and many other leading names of the British jazz scene, as well as backing several visiting American artists, including Buddy Greco, Charlie Byrd, Buddy Tate, Bob Wilber, and Kenny Davern.

Worth cites his inspiration from drummers Mel Lewis and Joe Morello.

He has also led his own line-ups, and his quartets and quintets have included saxophonists Ben Castle and Simon Allen, Paul Morgan on double bass, and pianists John Pearce or Robin Aspland. As of 2013, his quintet comprises Gareth Williams on keyboards, bassist Dave Green, Simon Allen on sax, and trumpeter Paul Jordanous.

== Discography ==
- 1992: At Sundown – Humphrey Lyttelton and Acker Bilk
- 1996: S'Wonderful: Live At Ronnie Scott's – Elaine Delmar
- 1998: Nobody Else But Me – Elaine Delmar
- 2003: Linger Awhile – Lee Gibson
- 2006: Barnestorming - Alan Barnes / Harry Allen
- 2006: Sideways - Alan Barnes and John Hallam
- 2006: Spontaneous Combustion - Bruce Adams and Alan Barnes
- 2010: The London Session - Alan Barnes / Warren Vache
