= Bill Ashton (jazz musician) =

British musician (1936–2025)

William Michael Allingham Ashton OBE (6 December 1936 – 8 March 2025) was a British band leader, saxophonist and composer who was best known for co-founding NYJO - the British National Youth Jazz Orchestra, of which he was musical director from 1965 until his retirement in 2009 when he became Life President.

== Career ==
From 1955 to 1957, he was educated at Rossall School which soon developed into a career in the Royal Air Force doing National Service, before he then went to Oxford University in 1957, where he first began playing jazz professionally at functions and competitions, founding the Oxford University Big Band. On leaving university in 1960, he went to France and worked as a professional musician in the American army bases for about nine months. Returning to London he started to join various blues bands, while supply teaching, mostly French. At one school, Highbury County Grammar School in Islington, he was immensely popular among the boys for his relaxed style, regaling them with anecdotes about his show business contacts as well as snippets related to his National Service. After working with Red Bludd's Bluesicians, he founded what became NYJO with Pat Evans and Mike Kershaw in 1965.

Ashton was highly regarded as an indefatigable promoter of British jazz talent, by organising tours, producing recordings, encouraging established players to collaborate with the band and publishing the works of young jazz composers.

He was appointed Member of the Order of the British Empire (MBE) for services to jazz in 1978 and Officer of the Order of the British Empire (OBE) in the 2010 Birthday Honours. Ashton had also received the BBC Radio 2 Jazz Award in 1995 for his Services to Jazz, a Silver Medal from the Worshipful Company of Musicians, and was a Fellow of Leeds College of Music.

== Personal life and death ==
Ashton was born in Blackpool, Lancashire on 6 December 1936. He died on 8 March 2025, at the age of 88.
