= National Youth Jazz Orchestra =

British jazz youth music education organisation

The National Youth Jazz Orchestra (NYJO), established as the London Schools' Jazz Orchestra in 1965, is a British youth jazz music education organisation.

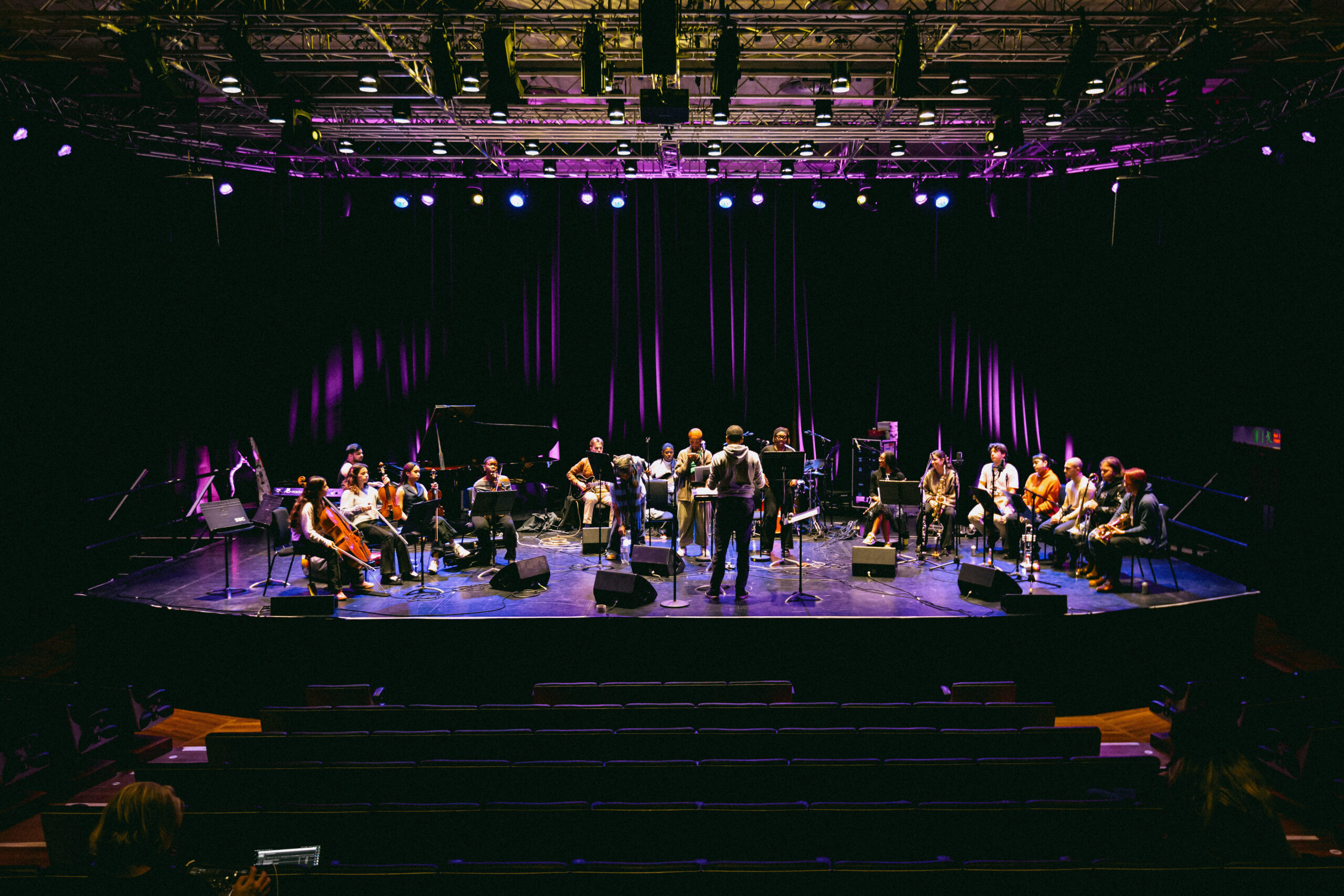
NYJO ensemble rehearses at Southbank Centre in February 2025

== History ==
The National Youth Jazz Orchestra (NYJO) was founded in 1965 by Bill Ashton. Based in the Royal Arsenal, London, England, NYJO started life as the London Schools' Jazz Orchestra, and evolved into the National Youth Jazz Orchestra.

In 2010, Mark Armstrong took over as music director of the flagship performing band, and artistic director of the organisation; Bill Ashton became life president, and Nigel Tully became executive chair.

In April 2015, NYJO became an National Portfolio Organisation of the Arts Council England in recognition of its role as an excellent youth arts institution and its ability to inspire young people to like and enjoy jazz. At the same time, NYJO acquired jazz's first ever royal patron, the Earl of Wessex.

In July 2021, Susie York Skinner became the chief executive. York Skinner announced her resignation in May 2024, leaving the organisation along with former artistic director Mark Armstrong.

Yvette Griffith OBE was named as new Chief Executive in August 2024 and Projjol Banerjea confirmed as new Chair in March 2025.

== Description ==
The band's aims are to provide an opportunity for gifted young musicians from around the UK to perform big band jazz in major concert halls, theatres, and on radio and television, and to make recordings, commission new works from British composers and arrangers, and to introduce a love of jazz to as wide an audience as possible, but especially to schoolchildren.

The performing band, NYJO, is selected by audition and invitation, and has a maximum age of 25. It performs around 40 gigs a year across the UK, the vast majority involving additional inspirational educational workshops for local schoolchildren, in partnership with the local Music Hub. It rehearses every Saturday at Woolwich Works, part of Woolwich's Royal Arsenal Riverside complex.

== Governance ==
As of March 2025, there are four resident music directors, and Projjol Banerjea and Paul Boniface are the Chair and Deputy Chair, respectively.

The Duke of Edinburgh is the royal patron. The honorary vice presidents are Valerie Amos, Baroness Amos, Guy Barker, Lord Coe, Lord Colwyn, Dame Cleo Laine, Kelvin Hopkins, Chi Onwurah, and Martin Taylor.

== Members ==
NYJO's members have included many of the major names in British jazz over the last three decades, including Julian Argüelles, Guy Barker, Chris Biscoe, John C. Williams, Richard James Burgess, Paul Edmonds, Teresa Gallagher, Steve Hill, David Wood, Nigel Hitchcock, Carol Kenyon, Dave O'Higgins, Simon Phillips, Gerard Presencer, Brian Priestley, Frank Ricotti, Jamie Talbot, Dave Watts, Tom Cawley, Gareth Lockrane, Rob Luft, Louis Dowdeswell, Callum Au, Chris White, Amy Winehouse, Bobby Worth and Neil Yates.

== Discography ==
NYJO has an extensive discography of over 40 recordings. A new double CD album entitled NYJO FIFTY was released in late 2015 to celebrate the 50th anniversary of NYJO's formation, with guest appearances by alumnus Mark Nightingale and by Zoe Rahman and Julian Siegel, both of whom were commissioned to write new works for the album.

In 2022, NYJO released an album entitled She Said, showcasing works by female jazz composers. It features music from Nikki Iles, Yazz Ahmed and Norma Winstone among others.

- 1971: The National Youth Jazz Orchestra - Play The Music Of Alan Cohen, Graham Collier, John Dankworth & Others
- 1973: National Youth Jazz Orchestra
- 1975: 11 Plus-Live At London Weekend Television
- 1976: Return Trip
- 1977: In Camra
- 1978: To Russia With Jazz
- 1979: Mary Rose
- 1980: Down Under
- 1980: The Sherwood Forest Suite
- 1982: Playing Turkey
- 1983: Why Don't They Write Songs Like This Anymore - Litsa Davies
- 1984: Born Again - Shorty Rogers
- 1985: Full Score
- 1985: Concrete Cows - John Dankworth
- 1986: With An Open Mind
- 1987: Concerto for Guitar and Jazz Orchestra - Paul Hart, John Williams
- 1987: Shades Of Blue & Green - with Lorraine Craig
- 1988: Maltese Cross
- 1989: Big Band Christmas
- 1990: Cooking With Gas
- 1990: Portraits - (The Music Of Harry South)
- 1991: Remembrance
- 1991: These are the Jokes
- 1993: Looking Forward Looking Back
- 1994: Hallmark
- 1995: Cottoning On
- 1995: In Control
- 1996: A View From The Hill
- 1996: Algarhythms
- 1997: Unison In All Things
- 1997: With One Voice
- 1998: 47 Frith Street
- 1999: Stepping Stones
- 2000: Who's Blue
- 2002: This Time Live at the Club
- 2003: Jasmine
- 2003: A Merry Christmas and a Happy New Year
- 2004: Jazz In Film
- 2005: Something Old Something New
- 2005: Two Suites
- 2006: London Pride
- 2008: When You're Ready
- 2009: A Christmas Carol In Six Movements
- 2012: The Change
- 2015: NYJO 50
- Compilation: The Very Best Of NYJO - 4CD Set
- Compilation: Sing A Song Of Ashton - 2CD Set
- 2022: She Said
