= Hugh Allen (conductor) =

English musician and academic

Sir Hugh Allen GCVO
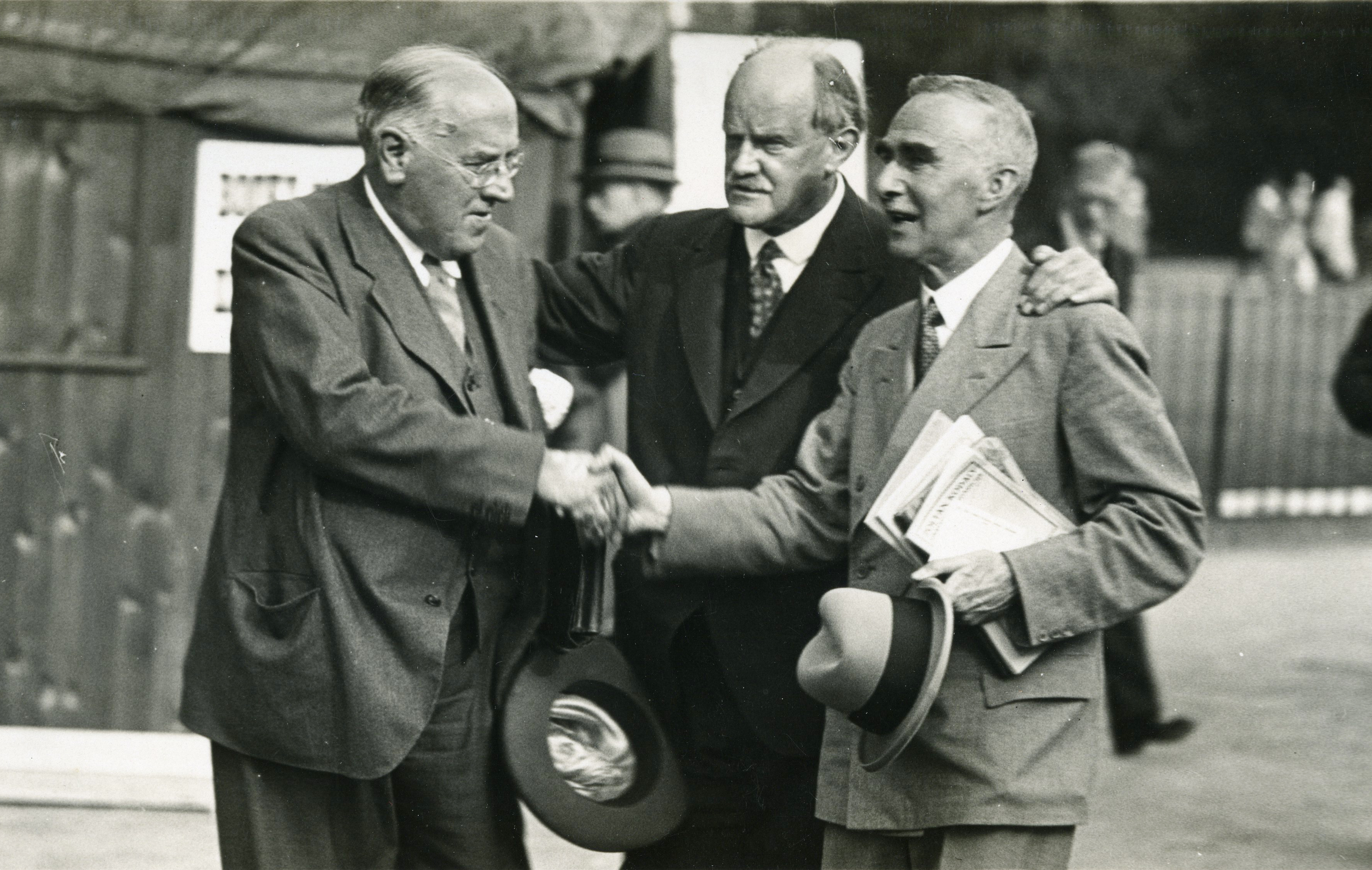
- Allen (centre) in c. 1932 with fellow musicians Walford Davies (left) and Cyril Rootham (right)
- Born: 23 December 1869; Reading, England
- Died: 20 February 1946 (aged 76); Oxford, England
- Education: Christ's College, Cambridge
- Occupations: Musician; academic; administrator
- Speech by Allen given at the Pavilion Theatre, Bournemouth, on 30 September 1934 on the occasion of the retirement of Sir Dan Godfrey as conductor of the Bournemouth Municipal Orchestra

Sir Hugh Percy Allen GCVO (23 December 1869 – 20 February 1946) was an English musician, academic, and administrator. He was a leading influence on British musical life in the first half of the 20th century.

== Early life and education ==
Hugh Allen was born in Reading, Berkshire, the youngest of seven children of John Herbert Allen (1834–1905), who worked for biscuit makers Huntley & Palmer, and Rebecca (1836–1919), daughter of Samuel Bevan Stevens, of the firm of Huntley, Bourne & Stevens, which manufactured tins for Huntley & Palmer. His musical talent was apparent from an early age, and at 11 he was organist of a local parish church. He was educated at Kendrick School, Reading, and won an organ scholarship to Christ's College, Cambridge, graduating BA from Cambridge in 1895. He became cathedral organist at St Asaph Cathedral and then Ely Cathedral, before, in 1901, becoming organist of New College, Oxford, where he revitalised the musical life of the university.

In 1902 he launched a new amateur orchestra in Oxford, called at first Dr Allen's Orchestra; in 1919 it became the Oxford Orchestral Society.

In 1907 he was appointed conductor of the Bach Choir in London, and in 1913 he shared the Leeds Festival with Artur Nikisch and Sir Edward Elgar.

== Oxford and the Royal College of Music ==
In 1918 Sir Walter Parratt resigned the professorship of music at Oxford, and Allen succeeded him. But when Sir Hubert Parry died later in the year Allen was appointed director of the Royal College of Music in London, and Oxford thought it would lose him. Allen in fact retained his professorship for the rest of his life. He kept his rooms at New College, and for another seven years conducted the Oxford Bach Choir.

As Director of the Royal College, as The Times later observed "he was then brought into a wider sphere and began to show unsuspected qualities of statesmanship." He expanded the size of the college from 200 to 600 students and consolidated the alliance between the Royal College and the Royal Academy of Music. In addition to his duties at the college, he continued to conduct. The Royal Choral Society, the Royal Philharmonic Society and the Incorporated Society of Musicians owed much to his help when they experienced difficult times. He became for a time "the acknowledged but unofficial head of the music profession in this country." At an Oxford dinner in honour of Ravel Allen was described as "notre ami qui fait chanter tout le monde."

== Retirement and death ==
At both the Royal College and at Oxford he modernised the curriculum and made the regulations for degrees both more liberal and more exacting. He retired from the college in 1937, but his years of work came to fruition in 1944 when Oxford founded a Faculty of Music.

Allen received many honours, being knighted in the 1920 King's Birthday Honours List and appointed a Commander of the Royal Victorian Order (CVO) in the 1926 New Years Honours List. He was promoted to Knight Commander (KCVO) in the 1928 King's Birthday Honours List 1928 and to Knight Grand Cross (GCVO) in the 1935 King's Birthday Honours List.

Besides receiving his Oxford doctorate he was awarded honorary doctorates by the universities of Cambridge (1925), Reading (1938), Sheffield (1926), and Berlin. He was an honorary fellow of Christ's College, Cambridge (1926); and in 1937 was Master of the Worshipful Company of Musicians.

On 17 February 1946, Allen was knocked down by a motorcyclist in Oxford. He died of his injuries three days later at Radcliffe Infirmary, aged 76.

== Personal life ==
On 2 April 1902, he married Edith Winifred Hall (1877–1966) and together they had one daughter and one son.

Cultural offices
Preceded by James Taylor	Organist and Master of the Choristers of New College, Oxford; 1901–1919	Succeeded by William Henry Harris
