= Beryl Bryden =

English jazz singer (1920–1998)

- Born: Beryl Audrey Bryden; 11 May 1920; Norwich, Norfolk, England
- Died: 14 July 1998 (aged 78) Paddington, London
- Genres: Jazz; Trad Jazz
- Occupation: Singer
- Instruments: Vocals; Washboard
- Years active: 1942-1998

Beryl Audrey Bryden (11 May 1920 – 14 July 1998) was an English jazz singer, who played with Chris Barber and Lonnie Donegan. Ella Fitzgerald once said of Bryden that she was "Britain's queen of the blues".

== Life and career ==
Beryl Audrey Bryden was born in Norwich, Norfolk, England, on 11 May 1920, and was the only child of Amos and Elsie Bryden. Her enthusiasm for jazz music began during her teenage years. She became a member of the National Rhythm Club when she was 17 and became secretary of the local branch in 1941. An ardent jazz fan she established a Nat Gonella fan club in her teens, before taking up the washboard and singing. Her vocal style was influenced by Bessie Smith but she avoided affectation of an American accent. Bryden was a friend of Black Anna Hannant who ran the Jolly Butchers pub in Ber Street, Norwich.

In 1942 at the age of 22, she moved to Cambridge. In 1945, after the war had ended, she moved to back to London, hoping to start a music career. She also worked with Mick Mulligan and George Melly at London jazz venues such as the Cook's Ferry Inn in Walthamstow and became a supporter of visiting American jazz acts when the Musicians Union ban was lifted and befriended amongst others, Buck Clayton, Louis Armstrong, and Bud Freeman with whom she recorded.

In May 1949 Bryden formed her own group called 'Beryl's Back-Room Boys', and later worked with Mike Daniels. At the same club in 1952 she met the French clarinettist Maxime Saury and sang with his band at The Club Du Vieux Colombier, District of Saint Germain Des Pres, Paris.

In 1955 she joined the Chris Barber band on washboard, and played on the group's gold disc, "Rock Island Line" with Lonnie Donegan on vocals. This track helped begin the 'skiffle' craze of the late 1950s. She later graduated to the Monty Sunshine jazz band covering Bessie Smith ("Young Woman's Blues", "Gimme a Pigfoot (And a Bottle of Beer)"), and long-term favourite "Coney Island Washboard Blues" which demonstrated her washboard technique. In 1972 she made guest appearances with the Lennie Hastings Oo-Yah Band along with trombone player George Chisholm.

She remained active at the end of the British trad jazz boom, and became particularly popular in Northern Europe, playing with the Ted Easton Jazz Band and The Piccadilly Six. On 13 July 1979, she headlined the North Sea Jazz Festival with Rod Mason and His Hot Five. In the 1980s she often sang with the New Orleans Syncopators, a Dutch jazz band with whom she recorded an album.

She remained active into the 1990s, playing with the Metropolitan Jazz Band, Digby Fairweather, Nat Gonella and her own Blue Boys. She made her last recording with Gonella in 1998, shortly before her death.

Bryden, and her Norwich roots, are celebrated in the theatre show, Norwich A Love Story, by theatre maker and poet John Osborne.

== Personal life and death ==
Bryden was a keen traveller. She was renowned for her flamboyant gowns and sculptured blonde wigs. She travelled widely and practised her hobbies of photography and deep-sea diving. She lived for many years at 166, Gloucester Terrace, Paddington in London.

She died from Lymphoma, aged 78, at St Mary's Hospital, Paddington, on 14 July 1998.

== Discography ==
- Two Moods of Beryl Bryden (Audiophile, 1994)
