= Momma Don't Allow =

- Opening title
- Directed by: Karel Reisz; Tony Richardson
- Written by: Karel Reisz; Tony Richardson
- Starring: The Chris Barber Jazz Band: Chris Barber; Monty Sunshine; Pat Halcox; Ron Bowden; Lonnie Donegan; Jim Bray; Ottilie Patterson
- Cinematography: Walter Lassally
- Edited by: John Fletcher
- Production company: BFI Experimental Film Fund
- Distributed by: British Film Institute
- Release date: 25 January 1956 (UK)
- Running time: 22 minutes
- Country: United Kingdom
- Language: English

Momma Don't Allow is a 1956 short British documentary film co-directed by Karel Reisz and Tony Richardson, and filmed by Walter Lassally. Produced by the British Film Institute Experimental Film Fund, it was first shown in February 1956 as part of the first Free Cinema programme at the National Film Theatre.

The film depicts a performance of The Chris Barber Jazz Band (with Ottilie Patterson) at The Fishmonger's Arms, a traditional jazz club in Wood Green, North London. It features extensive footage of skip jiving by the audience on the club's dance floor.
