= Archie Semple =

- Born: Archibald Stuart Nisbet Semple; 1 March 1928; Edinburgh, Scotland
- Died: 26 January 1974 (aged 45) London, England
- Genres: Jazz; Trad Jazz
- Occupations: Musician; Bandleader
- Instrument: Clarinet
- Years active: 1950s-1974

Archibald Stuart Nisbet "Archie" Semple (1 March 1928 – 26 January 1974) was a Scottish jazz clarinetist and bandleader, active principally within the trad jazz idiom.

== Biography ==
He was born in Edinburgh, Scotland. Semple played locally in Edinburgh at the start of his career, often with his trumpeter brother John. He moved to London, England, and led several of his own bands before joining Mick Mulligan in 1952.

He then worked with Freddy Randall during the 1953–54 season and then with Roy Crimmins and Alex Welsh from 1955 to 1963, becoming one of Welsh's most important sidemen. He recorded as a leader in the late 1950s and early 1960s as well, but retired due to health problems caused by heavy drinking in the middle of the decade. His influences included Edmond Hall and Pee Wee Russell.

He has been regarded as a 'very distinctive player with a rich and quirky musical imagination'. Many regarded Semple as a strong presence on the British traditional jazz scene at the time.

He made very few recordings under his own name, although a session was recorded which comes mainly from the archives of the 77 Records label, a British record company and label set up in 1957 by Doug Dobell, the proprietor of 'Dobell's Jazz Record Shop' at 77 Charing Cross Road, London. Five LPs were released under his name, the first in 1960 being Jazz for young lovers recorded on Columbia, then in 1962 the LP The Archie Semple Quarter (77/LP/10) of which only 100 copies were pressed on 10" vinyl. A further two LPs also recorded in 1962 on Columbia were Easy Living and The Twilight Cometh, with the last, The Clarinet of Archie Semple recorded in 1964 with Fred Hunt on piano and Dick Hawdon on trumpet (77 LEU 12/6). Due to a low number pressed, they did not enjoy wide circulation which helped Semple's 'cult status'.

In 1964, whilst on the stage of the Richmond Jazz Festival, Semple suffered a catastrophic nervous breakdown. Semple retired from playing aged 36 in 1965 and died in penury, from chronic alcoholism, nine years later in London aged 45 in January 1974.

== Other sources ==
- Clarrie Henry, "Archie Semple". Grove Jazz online.
