= Roy Crimmins =

- Born: Roy Crimmins; 2 August 1929; London, England
- Died: 27 August 2014 (aged 85) London, England
- Genres: Jazz; Trad jazz
- Occupations: Musician; Composer; Arranger
- Instrument: Trombone
- Years active: 1952–2014

Roy Crimmins, also known by the pseudonym Roy King, (2 August 1929 – 27 August 2014) was an English jazz trombonist, composer and arranger.

== Biography ==
Born in London, England, of Irish and English descent, Crimmins turned professional by joining the Mick Mulligan band in 1952. Originally self-taught, Crimmins was later mentored by the American bass trombonist with the Philarmonia Orchestra, Ray Premru, and the then Ted Heath principal trombonist, Don Lusher. With a career spanning 50 years, Crimmins has played and collaborated with many notable musicians, including Duke Ellington, Louis Armstrong, Archie Semple, Alex Welsh, Freddy Randall, Harry Gold and Lennie Hastings.

Collaborating with Alex Welsh in 1954, the pair started their own band, and recorded with American guest stars such as the clarinettist Pee Wee Russell and Wild Bill Davison. The band was active for the following decade, and Crimmins moved to Germany in 1965 where he kept a consistent line-up and a regular group. From 1970 until 1977, he lived in Switzerland, and formed his own band using the pseudonym of Roy King and recorded three albums. He toured Europe extensively during this era, and had his own television show in Vienna for five years. In the late 1970s, Crimmins went back to England and worked once again with Welsh until Welsh's death in 1982.

In the mid-1980s, Crimmins was approached by Bob Wilber, to join his Benny Goodman and Duke Ellington orchestras, interpreting the original Lawrence Brown, Tricky Sam Nanton and Juan Tizol trombone solos, performing at the Nice and North Sea Jazz Festivals. At this time, Crimmins was approached by the Mayor of Eilat, Israel, to advise on establishing an International Jazz Festival in Eilat. Crimmins' involvement in this venture led to the renowned Red Sea Jazz Festival. Soon after, Crimmins and his family moved to Tel Aviv, where he established the Israel Jazz Ensemble, and was commissioned by Musica Nova (a breakdown group from the Israel Philharmonic Orchestra) to write a concerto, which premiered in the Tel Aviv Museum of Art.

Roy Crimmins died aged 85, on 27 August 2014, in London, England, and is buried on a hill overlooking the Sea of Galilee.

== Original compositions ==
- "Lady Z"
- "Miriam's Drum"
- "The Earbender"
- "Balconies"
- "To Mr Charles M"
- Suite Alice - A suite in five movements (The fourth movement "The Jabberwocky" text by Lewis Carroll)
- "Judi's Jam"
- "Judi With An I"
- "Goodnight Sweet Prince"
- "The Rest Is Silence"
- "Concerto for Orchestra and Jazz Ensemble"
- "Special Arrangement: 'The Train and the River' (Guiffre)"
- Billy Rose is alive and well and living in Jerusalem - A suite in three movements:
  - "1. Entrance to the City"
  - "2. In the Beginning"
  - "3. And Nobody Hears (text: Mira Maor Crimmins)
  - Abigail's Lament
- "The Cats of Tel Aviv"
- "The Witch of Ein Dor"
