= John Crocker (jazz musician) =

English jazz musician (born 1937)

John Reginald Crocker (born 19 October 1937, in West Bridgford, Nottinghamshire, England) was the English leading clarinet and saxophone player for the Chris Barber jazz band for just over 30 years, before retiring in February 2003.

In addition to his band work, Crocker also played with musician Elton John, contributing clarinet to "Big Dipper" and tenor saxophone on "Shooting Star" for John's 1978 album, A Single Man. Since retiring Crocker has guested with several bands including Kenny Ball and a Ken Colyer tribute band.
