= Diz Disley =

Anglo-Canadian jazz guitarist and banjoist (1931–2010)

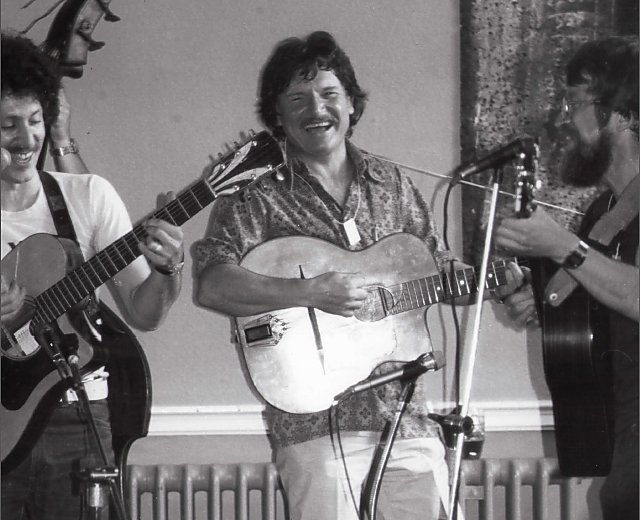
- Disley (centre) at the 1981 Essex Festival, England

Background information
- Born: William Charles Disley; 27 May 1931; Winnipeg, Manitoba, Canada
- Died: 22 March 2010 (aged 78) London, England
- Genre: Jazz
- Occupations: Guitarist; Graphic designer
- Instruments: Banjo, guitar
- Years active: 1950s–2000s

William Charles "Diz" Disley (27 May 1931 – 22 March 2010) was an Anglo-Canadian jazz guitarist and banjoist. He is best known for his acoustic jazz guitar playing, strongly influenced by Django Reinhardt, for his contributions to the UK trad jazz, skiffle and folk scenes as a performer and humorist, and for his collaborations with the violinist Stéphane Grappelli.

== Biography ==
=== Early life ===
William Charles Disley was born, to Welsh parents then overseas for work, in Winnipeg, Manitoba, Canada. When he was four, his parents moved back to Llandyssil in Montgomeryshire in Wales and then five years later to Ingleton, North Yorkshire, England, where his mother worked as schoolteacher. In his childhood, he learned to play the banjo, but took up jazz guitar at the age of 15, after being exposed to the playing of Django Reinhardt. As Disley recalled, his neighbour Norry Greenwood taught him the chords to "Miss Annabel Lee" and "Try a Little Tenderness" in the summer of 1946.

Disley showed an early gift for drawing. On leaving school he enrolled at Leeds College of Art, a college with a reputation for student music making, in particular trad jazz, and was soon playing in the Vernon City Ramblers and the Yorkshire Jazz Band, with trumpeter Dick Hawdon and clarinettist Alan Cooper.

Disley did his National Service overseas in the Army from 1950–1953, after which he resumed his studies in Leeds, and began selling cartoons to national newspapers and periodicals. In 1953 he worked for a summer season in Morecambe, Lancashire, as part of the comedy harmony group The Godfrey Brothers, still playing banjo. He moved to London and joined Mick Mulligan's band with George Melly. Melly described him as having "a beard and [...] the face of a satyr en route to a cheerful orgy". He worked with most of the trad jazz bands of the day, including those of Ken Colyer, Cy Laurie, Sandy Brown, Kenny Ball, and Alex Welsh. He played banjo and occasionally guitar. His first love remained the music of Django Reinhardt, in particular the sound of the pre-war Quintette du Hot Club de France. In 1958, he formed a quintet to replicate that sound, employing Dick Powell on violin, Danny Pursford and Nevil Skrimshire on rhythm guitars, and a range of double bassists including Tim Mahn.

As skiffle dominated traditional jazz in popular culture in the UK, in the late 1950s and early 1960s, Disley started working as guitarist with a number of skiffle groups, including those of Ken Colyer, Lonnie Donegan, Bob Cort and Nancy Whiskey, and performed on numerous recordings. With Ike Isaacs he appeared on Ken Sykora's Guitar Club on BBC Radio for a number of years and was voted second best (1960) and best (1961) British jazz guitarist in the UK Melody Maker jazz polls.

In January 1963, the British music magazine, NME reported that the biggest trad jazz event to be staged in Britain had taken place at Alexandra Palace. The event included George Melly, Alex Welsh, Acker Bilk, Chris Barber, Kenny Ball, Ken Colyer, Monty Sunshine, Bob Wallis, Bruce Turner, Mick Mulligan, and Disley. That same year Diz played the conductor in the Harrison Marks film The Chimney Sweeps (1963), a slapstick comedy starring Pamela Green.

=== Folk club performer and humorist ===
In the early to mid 1960s, the "trad" and skiffle booms were coming to an end and Disley moved across to the emerging folk club scene, developing a new persona as an entertainer/musical comedian with an act based on songs from trad jazz and the British music hall and other humorous ditties accompanied by lightly swinging guitar, monologues in the manner of Stanley Holloway (especially those penned by Marriott Edgar), banter with the audience, and a string of one-line jokes in the manner of W. C. Fields and Groucho Marx, always finding room at the end of the evening for some hot-club-style guitar instrumentals, often with the assistance of some unsuspecting second guitarist invited up from the audience. He was also employed by the BBC as compere for a number of shows, including introducing The Beatles on their first London concert. As arguably the "folk world"'s then most competent performer in the area of jazzy guitar accompaniment he collaborated with fiddle player Dave Swarbrick on several ragtime tunes the 1967 Dave Swarbrick album, Rags, Reels & Airs, along with singer-guitarist Martin Carthy on the more folk-based material. Disley also played guitar accompaniment to Mike Absalom on the latter's 1968 album, Save the Last Gherkin for Me. By the 1970s, he was one of the folk scene's busiest artists and a mainstay of folk festivals as musician and compere.

=== Back to jazz with Stephane Grappelli ===
In 1973, he was influential in persuading Quintette du Hot Club de France violinist Stéphane Grappelli to return to public performances using an all-strings acoustic line-up, recreating the spirit of the Quintette for a new generation of listeners. Before this, Grappelli had spent a number of years playing "cocktail jazz" in a Paris hotel. After a couple of "warm up" gigs in small folk clubs, they played together to an unexpectedly warm reception at the 1973 Cambridge Folk Festival with Denny Wright on second acoustic guitar. This began a collaboration between Grappelli and the Diz Disley Trio, sometimes billed The Hot Club of London, with tours of Australia, Europe, and the United States. Karl Dallas reported Disley as having "single-handedly created a revival of interest in the music of Stephane Grappelli, which has taken him to Carnegie Hall, Australia, and New Zealand" (the latter in September 1974). "...the night he closed at the Palladium, he went to The Troubadour where he was booked later that night to perform his folk club act of idiocy and mayhem, keeping up the tradition he has built up over the past 20 years for delivering a shrewd mixture of musical brilliance and vocal insanity." There were a few changes in line-up with Ike Isaacs, Louis Stewart, and John Etheridge alternating as second guitarist. The Disley Trio accompanied Grappelli for another five years until Disley was forced to take a break in 1979 after breaking his wrist when he was knocked down by a motorcycle in London. His replacement was a young Martin Taylor, who toured with Grappelli for ten years. During that period, Disley continued to play folk clubs and festivals as a solo performer and also mentored a young Chris Newman, who would establish his own name in the swing jazz, guitar flatpicking and celtic folk guitar fields.

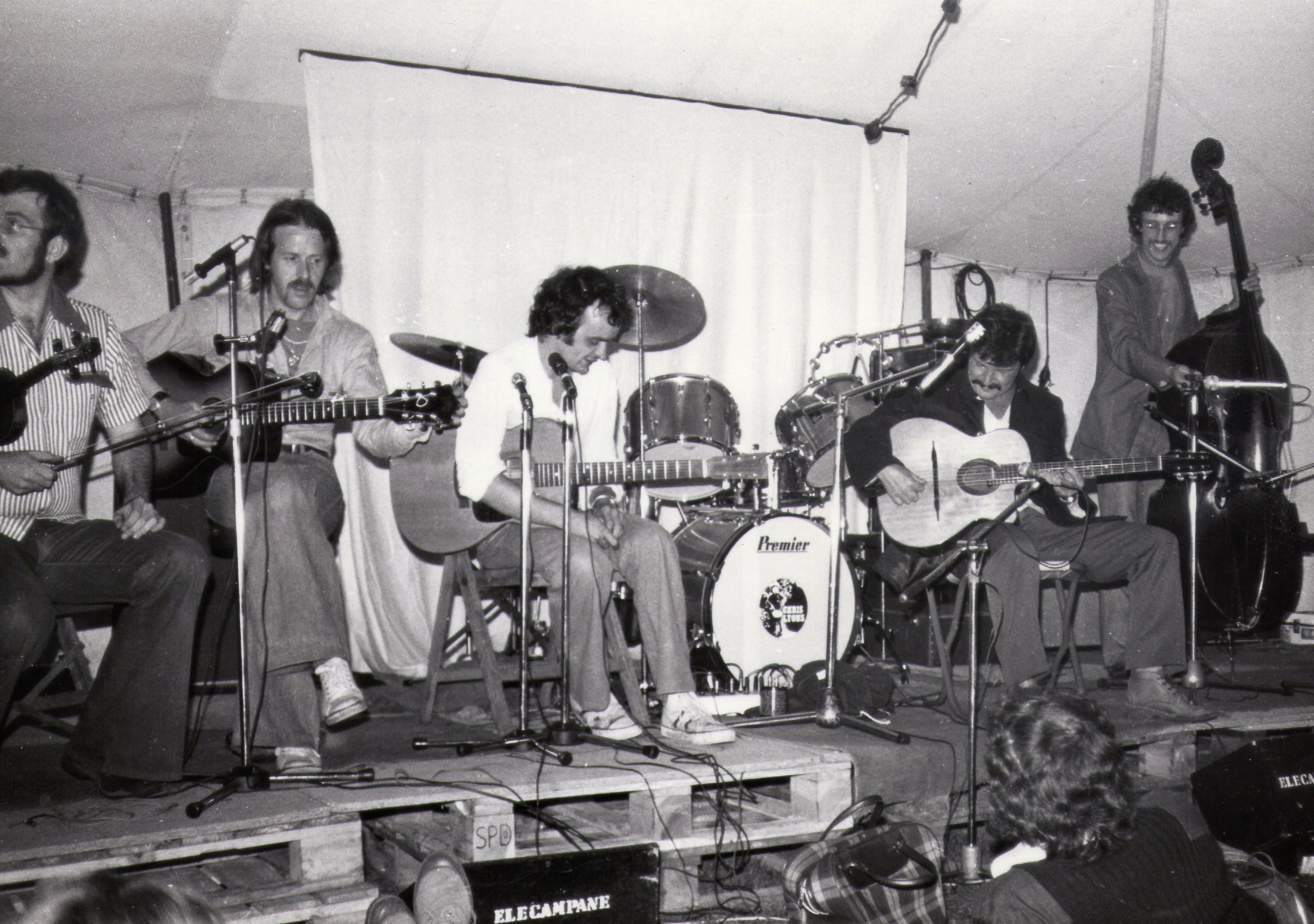
Disley (right of centre) jams onstage with the Chris Newman group at the 1977 Cambridge Folk Festival

In 1978 Grappelli, Disley, and others were invited by David Grisman to contribute the score to the film King of the Gypsies. Grappelli and Disley had walk-on parts as gypsy musicians and were suitably attired for the occasion, but the soundtrack to the movie was never released.

Disley was back with Grappelli in 1981–2 with a visit to the U.S. which resulted in parts of two performances captured on film, later released as Stéphane Grappelli - Live in San Francisco although the two musicians parted ways soon after, this time for good. For the second concert performance (filmed at the Great American Music Hall), Grappelli and the Trio were joined for an encore by David Grisman, Darol Anger, Mike Marshall, and Rob Wasserman for a performance of "Sweet Georgia Brown".

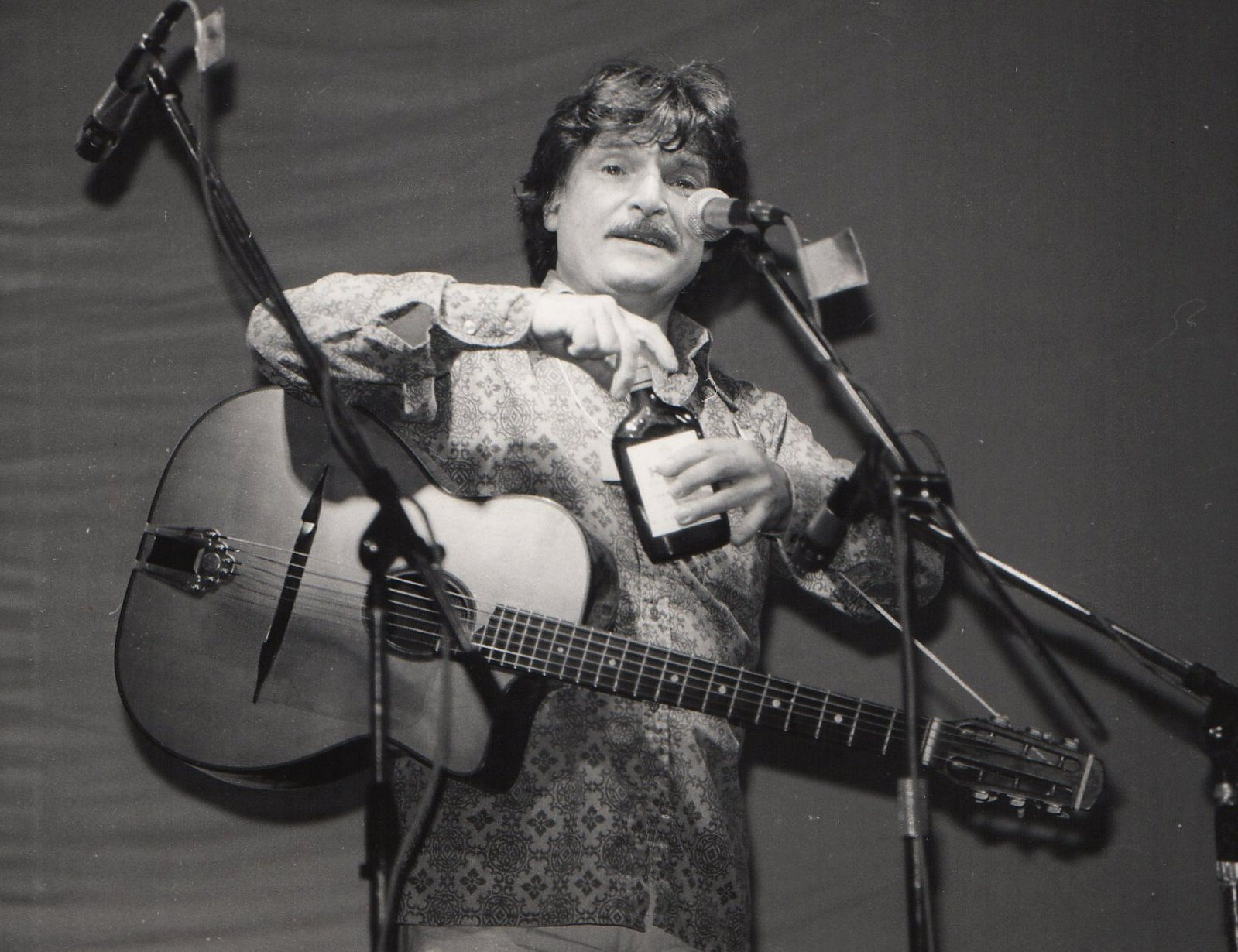
Disley at the 1981 Essex Festival in his "folk entertainer" persona: "Just one drink to steady myself..."

=== After Grappelli ===
In the early 1980s Disley formed a working partnership with gypsy jazz guitar prodigy Bireli Lagrene, with whom he again toured the world, including a return visit to Carnegie Hall.

In 1984 Disley was instrumental in forming a club quintet for Nigel Kennedy, who was starting to explore other musical styles. Musicians with Kennedy were Jeff Green, Ian Cruickshank, Nils Solberg (guitars), and Dave Etheridge (bass), who had played with Disley and Denny Wright on their 1973 tour with Grappelli. In 1986, Disley formed the Soho String Quintette with Johnny Van Derrick (violin), Nils Solberg, Jeff Green, and David Etheridge. Zing Went the Strings was issued by Waterfront Records.

In the 1990s, during several years spent in Los Angeles, Disley recorded with blues saxophonist Big Jay McNeely and country-rockabilly musician Ray Campi. He painted several portraits of jazz musicians, including Illinois Jacquet, in the style of the Cubists. In the 2000s he spent time in Spain, where he had purchased land with the stated intention of building a golf course. He ran a jazz bar there from 1988, between trips to the UK for continued performances. He led his own groups and made overseas tours until suffering a heart attack and the onset of dementia.

In early 2010 he suffered ill health and was admitted to the Royal Free Hospital in Hampstead on 2 February. He died on 21 March 2010. He never married and left no direct survivors.

== Guitar style ==
Disley's style was frequently compared to Django Reinhardt's, particularly the single-string soloing. But he was also influenced by plectrum-style players such as Eddie Lang, Lonnie Johnson, and Teddy Bunn, During the early part of his career, Disley developed an accompaniment style that incorporated complex and subtle jazz harmonies, the ability to play in any key anywhere on the instrument, including traditionally "non guitar-friendly" keys such as B flat and E flat, the choice of numerous alternate voicings for any chord, plus the incorporation of moving figures in the bassline and internal notes of chords. Although much of Disley's playing in this respect remains undocumented from his folk club years except for a few amateur recordings, the two tracks on Dave Swarbrick's Rags, Reels & Airs album give an indication of his swinging accompaniment.

Much better documented are the years of Disley's association with Grappelli. His rhythm playing is notable for the lightness and propulsion engendered by his right hand technique while using Selmer/Maccaferri-style instruments noted for their projection and bright open tone, as well as choice of appropriate chord voicings. His contributions are most easily discernible in the solo introductions to certain swing tunes and in acoustic guitar solos backed by the other rhythm guitar and double bass.

== Anecdotes and personal reminiscences ==
Disley was very much a one-off "character" and remembered for his personality traits and eccentricities. Contributors talk of his chaotic life. He had the ability to make large sums of money and then be completely penniless. He drove and slept in a Rolls-Royce hearse with a sack of carrots and a juicer, believing that carrot juice would offset the effects of alcohol. He arrived at clubs and discovered he got the week of his performance wrong. He frequently arrived at folk clubs without his guitar, borrowing one from the audience, upon which he would play quite unaffected by any instrumental inadequacies. He addressed most people he met as "Dear Boy". His most frequent request was for an advance on his fee or to cash a check for the same purpose, which he would refer to in slang as "sausage me a gregory": sausage and mash for "cash", Gregory Peck for "check". David "Brillo" Etheridge (double bass) and Chris Newman (guitar) have spoken highly of his mentoring and sharing of his musical knowledge at formative stages in their careers.

== Discography ==
=== As leader ===
- At the White Bear (Jazzology, 1985)
- Diz Disley and his String Quintet (Lake, 2011)

=== As sideman ===
With Ken Colyer

- At the 100 Club, Johnny Parker (2000)
- BBC Jazz Club Vol. 7 (2001)
- Captured Moments (2001)
- Christmas with Colyer (2003)

With Stéphane Grappelli

- Violinspiration (1975)
- Tiger Rag Revisited (1977)
- Live at Carnegie Hall (1983)
- Shades of Django (1990)
- Live in San Francisco (2000)
- Live at the Cambridge Folk Festival (2000)
- Live at Corby Festival Hall (2003)

With others

- At the BBC 1957–1962: The Airshots, Kenny Ball (2000)
- Like an Old Fashioned Waltz, Sandy Denny (Island, 1974)
- A Little Bit of Heartache, Rosie Flores & Ray Campi (Watermelon, 1997)
- A Jazz Legend: Through the Years 1930-1998, Nat Gonella (Avid, 1998)
- DGQ-20, David Grisman (Acoustic Disc, 1996)
- At the Jazz Band Ball Vol 3, Humphrey Lyttelton (2001)
- Last of the Blues Shouters, Big Miller & the Blues Machine (1992)
- Rags, Reels & Airs, Dave Swarbrick (1967)

== Filmography ==
- Various TV and concert performance extracts included on DVD: Stéphane Grappelli: A Life In The Jazz Century, Music on Earth MoE 001, 2002 (2-DVD set)
- Stéphane Grappelli Live in San Francisco - Live 1982 concert recordings with Diz Disley and Martin Taylor (guitars), Jack Sewing (double bass) - DVD, Storyville Films 26072, 2007
- Diz Disley's Soho String Quintette: Sweet Georgia Brown - Anglia TV, September 1986 (from promotional tour for "Zing Went The Strings" album)
- Diz Disley's Soho String Quintette: Roses of Picardy - Anglia TV, September 1986 (from promotional tour for "Zing Went The Strings" album)
- Diz Disley's Soho String Quintette: Sweet Georgia Brown - Anglia TV, September 1986 (from promotional tour for "Zing Went The Strings" album)

Other filmed performances apparently in existence (information from):

- Stéphane Grappelli, violin; Diz Disley & Martin Taylor, guitars: "Rhythm On 2" Great Malvern, UK, BBC2
- Stéphane Grappelli, violin; Diz Disley & Martin Taylor, guitars; Julian Lloyd Webber, cello: "Rhythm On 2" Edinburgh, UK, BBC2
