= Jim Douglas (guitarist) =

Scottish jazz guitarist and banjoist (1942–2025)

Robert James Elliot Douglas (13 May 1942 – October 2025) was a Scottish jazz guitarist, banjoist and author born in Gifford, East Lothian, Scotland. He is best known for his work with the Alex Welsh band, which saw him playing with musicians such as Red Allen, Earl Hines, and Ruby Braff. His membership of the band ran from 1962 until the group disbanded in 1981.

Douglas wrote and self-published a semi-autobiographical book, Tunes, Tours and Travel-itis - Eighteen years of Facts, Faces and Fun with the Alex Welsh Band, in which he cites several humorous encounters with legends of the business, as well as recounting the band's many strange and bizarre misadventures. He followed this up three years later with Teenage to Travel-itis - Growing Up in a World of Jazz. The sequel chronicles his adventures in the Jazz world before and after his time with the Alex Welsh Band.

He played drums in his youth before switching to guitar. In his teens he accompanied clarinettist Pete Kerr. As part of a Dixieland band, he performed in Germany in 1960. Soon after, he began playing with Alex Welsh. In 1971 he appeared on the album Freddy Randall and His Famous Jazz Band. Other than Kerr and Welsh, he worked with Alan Elsdon, Lennie Hastings, Ed Polcer, and Keith Smith.

Douglas later lived in the Philippines. He died there in early October 2025, at the age of 83.
