= Bruce Turner =

English jazz musician

- Born: 5 July 1922; Saltburn-by-the-Sea, North Yorkshire, England
- Died: 28 November 1993 (aged 71) Newport Pagnell, Buckinghamshire, England
- Genre: Jazz
- Instruments: Clarinet, alto saxophone
- Years active: 1948–1993

Malcom Bruce Turner (5 July 1922 – 28 November 1993) was an English jazz saxophonist, clarinetist, and bandleader.

== Biography ==
Born in Saltburn-by-the-Sea, North Yorkshire, England, and educated at Dulwich College, he learned to play the clarinet as a schoolboy and began playing alto saxophone while serving in the Royal Air Force in 1943 during World War II. He played with Freddy Randall from 1948–53 and worked on the Queen Mary in a dance band and in a quartet with Dill Jones and Peter Ind. He briefly studied under Lee Konitz in New York City in 1950.

His first period with Humphrey Lyttelton ran from 1953 to 1957 but began inauspiciously. At a concert performed in Birmingham's Town Hall, Lyttelton's more literal traditionalist fans displayed a banner instructing "Go Home Dirty Bopper!" After leaving Lyttelton he led his Jump Band from 1957–65, which was featured in the 1961 film, Living Jazz. Turner arranged the music for this film. On 16 and 17 February 1961, Turner and his band recorded the album Jumpin' at the NFT (National Film Theatre) which was issued later that year on Doug Dobell's 77 Records label to coincide with the film's release. In January 1963, the British music magazine New Musical Express (NME) reported that the biggest trad jazz event to be staged in Britain had taken place at Alexandra Palace. The event included George Melly, Diz Disley, Acker Bilk, Chris Barber, Kenny Ball, Ken Colyer, Monty Sunshine, Bob Wallis, Alex Welsh, Mick Mulligan and Turner.

He returned to Randall's group from 1964 to 1966, and played with Don Byas (1966) and Acker Bilk (1966–70). He continued to work with Lyttelton and Ind in the 1960s, 1970s, and 1980s, and he played with the Jump Band intermittently; he also worked with Wally Fawkes, John Chilton, Stan Greig (1975–76), Alex Welsh, and Dave Green. He led small ensembles in the 1990s until his death in 1993 in Newport Pagnell. He was noted for his quiet voice. Humphrey Lyttelton claimed that on a clear day it could be heard two inches away. His eccentricities included speaking a private language in which everybody, regardless of age or gender, was called "Dad", he repeated phrases, and he used outdated slang such as "Some fun, I'd say!" from comics of the 1930s.

Turner's autobiography Hot Air, Cool Music, published by Quartet Books, appeared in 1984. He wrote a column on jazz for the Daily Worker.

== Discography ==
=== As leader ===
- 1961 Jumpin' at the NFT (77 Records)
- 1963 Going Places (Philips BL7590)
- 1985 The Dirty Bopper
- 2001 Jumpin' for Joy
- 2012 Accent on Swing

=== As sideman or guest ===
With Wild Bill Davison

- 1965 With Freddy Randall and His Band
- 1975 Wild Bill Davison with Ted Easton and his Jazzfriends
- 1986 Lady of the Evening
- 1998 Struttin' with Some Barbecue
- 1999 Swinging Wild

With Ewan MacColl

- 1965 The Ballad of John Axon
- 1966 Singing the Fishing
- 1968 The Travelling People with Charles Parker, Peggy Seeger
- 1999 The Song of a Road with Charles Parker, Peggy Seeger

With others

- 1955 The 1955 London Sessions, Big Bill Broonzy
- 1974 Swinging Scorpio, Buddy Tate
- 1983 It Seems Like Yesterday, Humphrey Lyttelton
- 1987 Before My Time, Lol Coxhill
- 1989 There's Yes! Yes! In Your Eyes, Patrick Halcox
- 1992 Last of the Blues Shouters, Big Miller & the Blues Machine
- 1993 More Than Pye in the Sky, Lonnie Donegan
