= Ian Christie (musician) =

English jazz clarinetist (1927–2010)

- Born: Robert Ian Christie; 24 June 1927; Blackpool, England
- Died: 19 January 2010 (aged 82)
- Genres: Jazz; Trad jazz
- Occupation: Musician
- Instrument: Clarinet
- Years active: 1946–2010

Robert Ian Christie (24 June 1927 – 19 January 2010) was an English jazz clarinetist best known for playing in a number of trad jazz ensembles of the 1950s, including the Christie Brothers' Stompers, featuring Ken Colyer and Dickie Hawdon, with his brother, Keith Christie.

He lived in Warwick Road, then Lomond Avenue, off Preston New Road, attending Devonshire Road School and Palatine Central.

His admiration of jazz music was developed through listening to the wireless, as well as visiting the now defunct Rhythm Club near Queen's Square and via his father, who was a Scottish piano tuner and played banjo with The Blackpool Banjo Band. He left school at the age of 14 in 1943 to work as an apprentice electrician. Christie took lessons under Charlie Farrell, but joined the Royal Air Force and took up photography as his primary interest. After Keith Christie joined Humphrey Lyttelton's band, Ian Christie soon followed; he completed his photography studies with Lyttelton's financial help. Christie also worked extensively with Mick Mulligan and George Melly in the 1950s and 1960s.

Aside from music, Christie worked as a film critic for The Daily Express for over 25 years and continued to work as a photographer. He worked in trad jazz ensembles into the 2000s, with the Wyre Levee Stompers, the Merseysippi & Parade Jazz Band, and the Tony Davis Band, among others. In his later years, he played with Graham Tayar in his Crouch End All Stars.
