= Ray Foxley =

British jazz pianist

Raymond Geoffrey Foxley (28 December 1928 – 6 July 2002) was a British jazz pianist.

Foxley was born in Birmingham, England. He led his own bands from 1946, including the Gutbucket Six, the Gully Low Stompers and the Levee Ramblers. After settling in London in the 1950s he worked with Bobby Mickleburgh, Mick Mulligan, Chris Barber, Mike Daniels and Ken Colyer during that decade. A further move to Bromsgrove in 1960 meant that he played more in the Midlands. In the 1960s he was part of Ken Ingram's Band and Eddie Matthews' Jump Band. In the following decade he freelanced, led his own quintet, and played in Europe with Rod Mason. Foxley returned to Colyer in 1986, and stayed with the Ken Colyer Trust Band until 1994, following the leader's death. In the same decade, he also freelanced and led his own band. He also gave solo performances throughout his career. Much of what he played was traditional jazz, but he "was also admired by avant-gardists like sopranoist Lol Coxhill and percussionist Roger Turner".The last six years of his life he enjoyed being piano player for the One More Time band, led by trumpeter Max Emmons, which had a weekly residency in the Brewery Tap pub in Brentford. Foxley died in London on 6 July 2002.

== Discography ==
- Six for Two, 1979, on the Jeton label
- Professor Foxley's Sporting House Music, 1978, on the Jeton label
