= Skip jive =

British dance

Skip jive is a British dance, descended from the jazz dances of the 1930s and 1940s jive and ultimately from the Lindy Hop. Danced to trad jazz music, it was popular in England in the 1950s and 1960s in jazz clubs in London; notably Jazzshows (now the 100 Club, 100 Oxford St) and the Ken Colyer Club (Studio 51 Gt Newport St., now closed).

== General references ==
- "Skip Jive". howtojive.com. Archived from the original on 22 December 2019.
