= Pat Halcox =

British trumpeter (1930–2013)

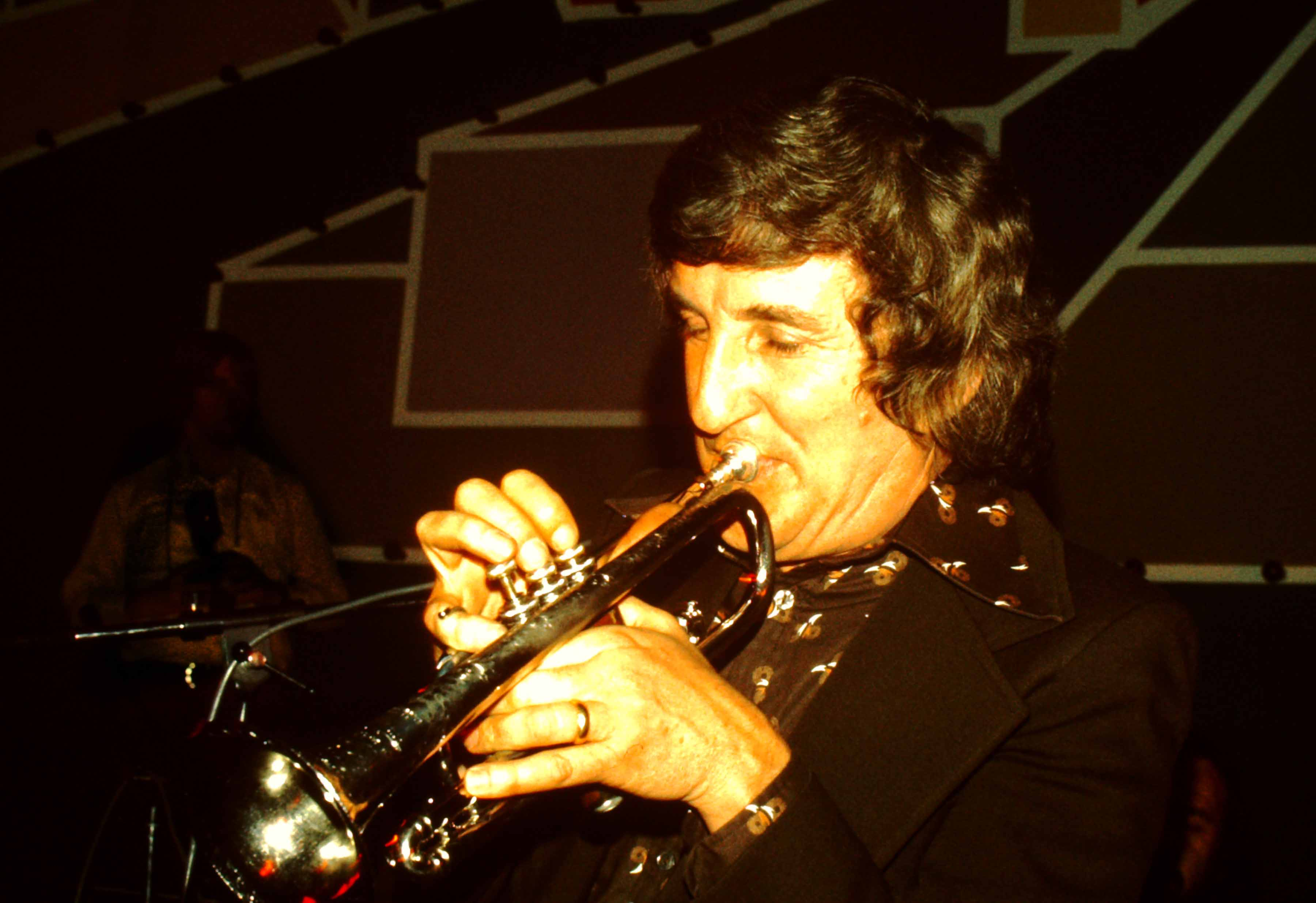
Pat Halcox (Göppingen, Germany 1975)

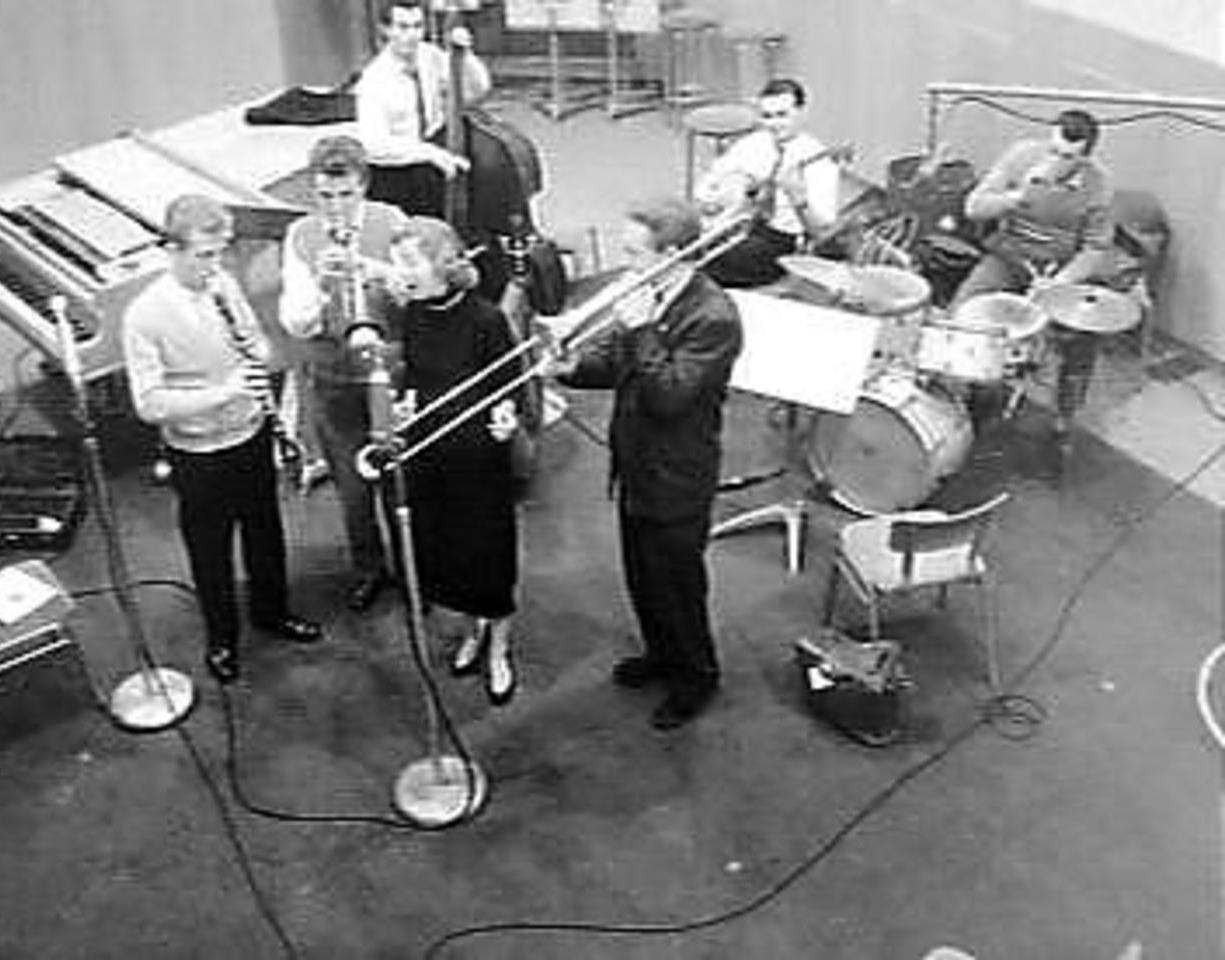
Halcox & Chris Barber Band (February 1957)

Patrick John Halcox (18 March 1930 – 4 February 2013) was an English jazz trumpeter.

== Biography ==
Halcox was born in Chelsea, London, England, and became the trumpet player in the Chris Barber Jazz Band, when the band took that name on 31 May 1954. He was originally offered the spot earlier, but elected to continue his studies as a research chemist. Ken Colyer was invited to fill the vacancy in 1953, and the band became known as the Ken Colyer Jazz Band, as Colyer had recently returned from New Orleans, and the other members, including Chris Barber, Lonnie Donegan and Monty Sunshine, decided that this New Orleans experience would add credibility.

The band effectively parted company with Colyer after a dispute about its musical direction. Halcox took Colyer's place, in what then become Barber's group, and as the original six piece band eventually grew to eleven members, Halcox remained present. Although primarily the trumpet player, Halcox also had a fine singing voice, and led the band's various renditions of "Ice Cream", one of their most popular standards. He also played piano on the Lonnie Donegan recording of "Digging My Potatoes".

The Pat Halcox Allstars did make a recording of their own during a Chris Barber Band summer break, now re-released as a Lake Records CD.

Halcox announced his retirement from the Chris Barber Band at the age of 78, effective from July 2008.

== Death ==
Halcox died on 4 February 2013 at the age of 82.
