= Fred Hunt (musician) =

English jazz pianist (1923–1986)

- Born: Herbert Frederick Hunt; 21 September 1923; London, England
- Died: 25 April 1986 (aged 62) Weybridge, Surrey, England
- Genres: Jazz; Trad jazz
- Occupation: Musician
- Instrument: Piano
- Years active: 1940s–1986

Herbert Frederick Hunt (21 September 1923 – 25 April 1986) was an English jazz pianist.

== Early life ==
Born in London as the younger son of a pianist mother and a cellist father, he enjoyed thorough musical education from his parents. However, Hunt was a self taught pianist. He started playing piano at the age of 13 and played local gigs before joining the Royal Air Force.

== Career ==
After demobilisation, he began his musical career playing semi-professionally with Mike Daniels and the Cy Laurie Four in 1951. He then became professional and went on to join Alex Welsh's band from 1954 to 1962 and again from 1964 to 1974.

As Welsh's primary pianist, and often a featured soloist, he became one of Britain's leading trad jazz musicians, and recorded with Eddie Davis, Bud Freeman, Eddie Miller, and Ben Webster in 1967. His work with Alex Welsh did not stop him from accompanying visiting Americans, including recording with the four-tenor group, Tenor Of Jazz, featuring Ben Webster and Eddie "Lockjaw" Davis, which toured in the late 1960s.

After leaving Welsh in 1974, he played in Copenhagen and South Africa, then split his time after 1976 between Britain, Denmark and Germany. He led a trio featuring drummer Lennie Hastings from 1978, although Hastings died that year.

In 1979 the German label Erus Records released a direct cut LP called Yesterdays, which featured the Fred Hunt Trio (Fred Hunt on piano, Brian Mursell on bass and Roger Nobes on drums) in front of a live audience.

Other albums include Peals on Velvet (trio) recorded 1968, Elegie (trio with Roy Rubin and Lennie Hastings) recorded 1978 and Blues 'n' Boogie a duo with Mike Bracewell and one track with Alex Welsh added on cornet.

He toured with Wild Bill Davison late in the 1970s and played with Welsh once more in the early 1980s, before retiring due to failing health. He still played frequently at London's PizzaExpress Jazz Club until his death in 1986. He died in Weybridge, Surrey aged 62.

He is best remembered for his long association with the Alex Welsh band and, as such, became a top pianist in both modern jazz and trad jazz musical settings.

== Other sources ==
- Claire Henley, "Fred Hunt". Grove Jazz online.
