= Alex Welsh (musician) =

Scottish jazz trumpeter and bandleader (1929–1982)

- Born: Alex Welsh; 9 July 1929; Edinburgh, Scotland
- Died: 25 June 1982 (aged 52) Hillingdon, London
- Genres: Jazz, Dixieland Jazz
- Occupations: Musician; Band leader Jazz Singer
- Instruments: Trumpet; Cornet; Vocals
- Years active: 1947-1982

Alex Welsh (9 July 1929 – 25 June 1982) was a Scottish jazz musician who played cornet and trumpet and was also a bandleader and singer,

== Biography ==
Born in Edinburgh, Scotland, Welsh started playing in the teenage Leith Silver Band and with Archie Semple's Capital Jazz Band. After moving to London in the early 1950s, he formed a band with clarinetist Archie Semple, pianist Fred Hunt, trombonist Roy Crimmins, and drummer Lennie Hastings. The band played a version of Chicago-style dixieland jazz and was part of the traditional jazz revival in England in the 1950s. In the 1960s, Welsh's band played with Earl Hines, Red Allen, Peanuts Hucko, Pee Wee Russell, and Ruby Braff.

During the 1960s and early 1970s, Welsh frequently toured, including many visits to the United States. He was influenced by his fellow trad jazz bandleader Chris Barber and built up and extensive musical repertoire, working from popular music as well as jazz and building up a large mainstream following for ensembles.

Welsh recorded for the British Decca label from 1955 and had four records released that year, "I'll Build a Stairway to Paradise" (Decca F10538), "Blues My Naughtie Sweetie Gives to Me" (Decca F10557) and "What Can I Say After I Say I'm Sorry" (Decca F10652) plus "Dixielanders at the RFH" an EP (extended play single) on Decca DFE 6254. Six years later in 1961 the band's single "Tansy" on Columbia Records DB 4686 peaked at No. 45 and remained on the UK singles chart for four weeks. The single was released as music from the film No My Darling Daughter. The film was based on the play Handful of Tansy by Kay Bannerman and Harold Brooke, and followed teenager Tansy Carr (played by Juliet Mills) as she runs off with American Cornelius Allingham (James Westmoreland).

In January 1963, British music magazine NME reported that the biggest trad jazz event to be staged in Britain had taken place at Alexandra Palace. The event included George Melly, Diz Disley, Acker Bilk, Chris Barber, Kenny Ball, Ken Colyer, Monty Sunshine, Bob Wallis, Bruce Turner, Mick Mulligan and Welsh.

Welsh toured internationally and played at the 1967 Antibes jazz festival, the 1968 Newport Jazz Festival, and 1978 Nice Jazz Festival. In the period 1970-1980 Welsh was a performer with his Alex Welsh Band at public house venues throughout the UK, having performed at the Bell Pub in Maidenhead, Berkshire, where he was a regular in the early 1970s, and the Five Ways Pub in Sherwood, Nottingham in 1981 among many others.

A concert was held in 2016 at the Edinburgh Jazz Festival as a tribute to him. A further festival was planned in his memory in July 2021.

== Death ==
He died in June 1982 in Hillingdon hospital in London, England, at the age of 52.

== Discography ==
- Dixieland to Duke/The Melrose Folio (1957/60)
- Music of the Mauve Decade (1960)
- Classic Concert (1971)

With Peanuts Hucko

- Peanuts Hucko Vol. 1 (Lake, 2002 [1967])
