= Monty Sunshine =

English jazz clarinettist (1928–2010)

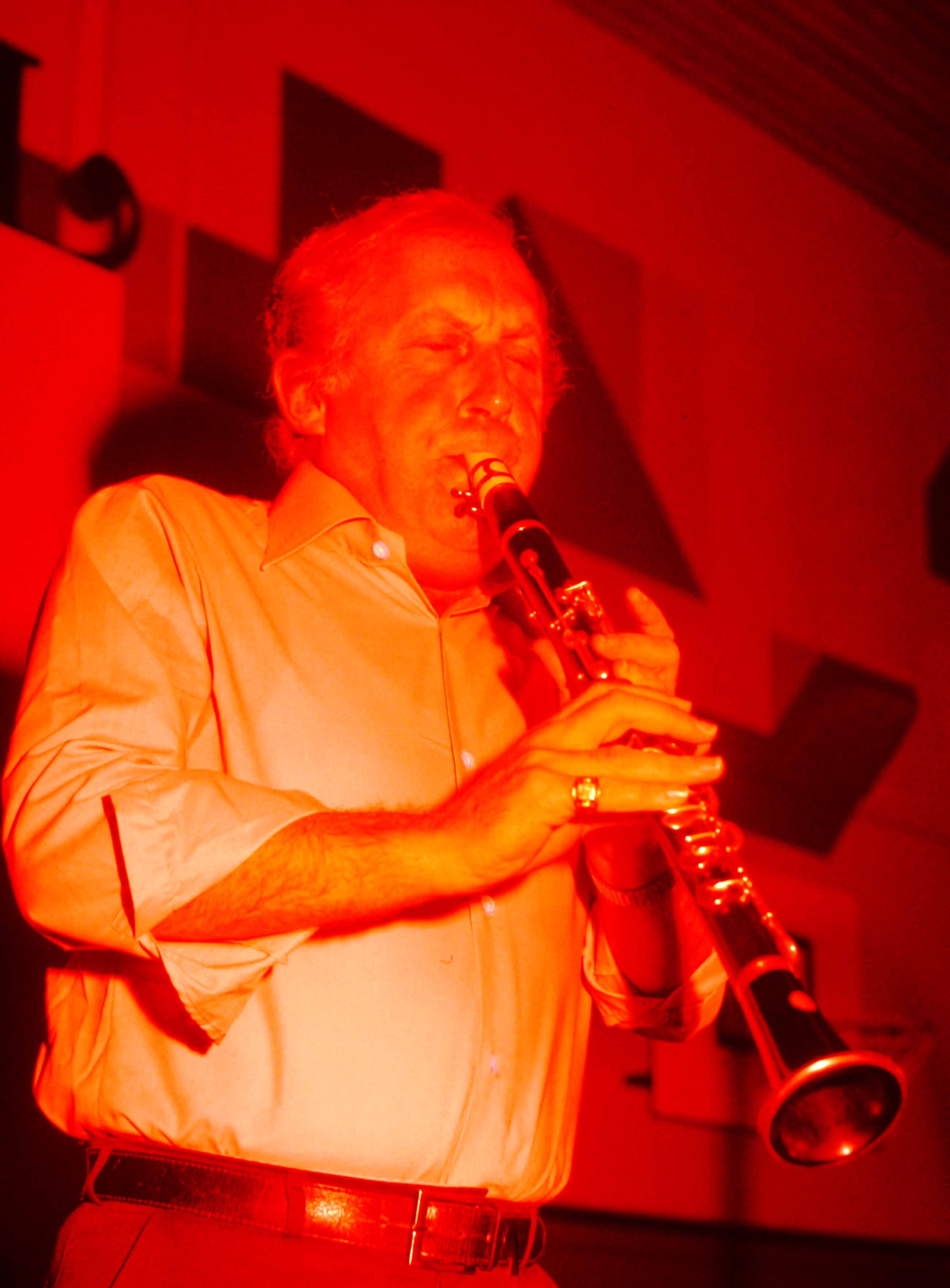
Monty Sunshine (Heiningen, Germany 1976)

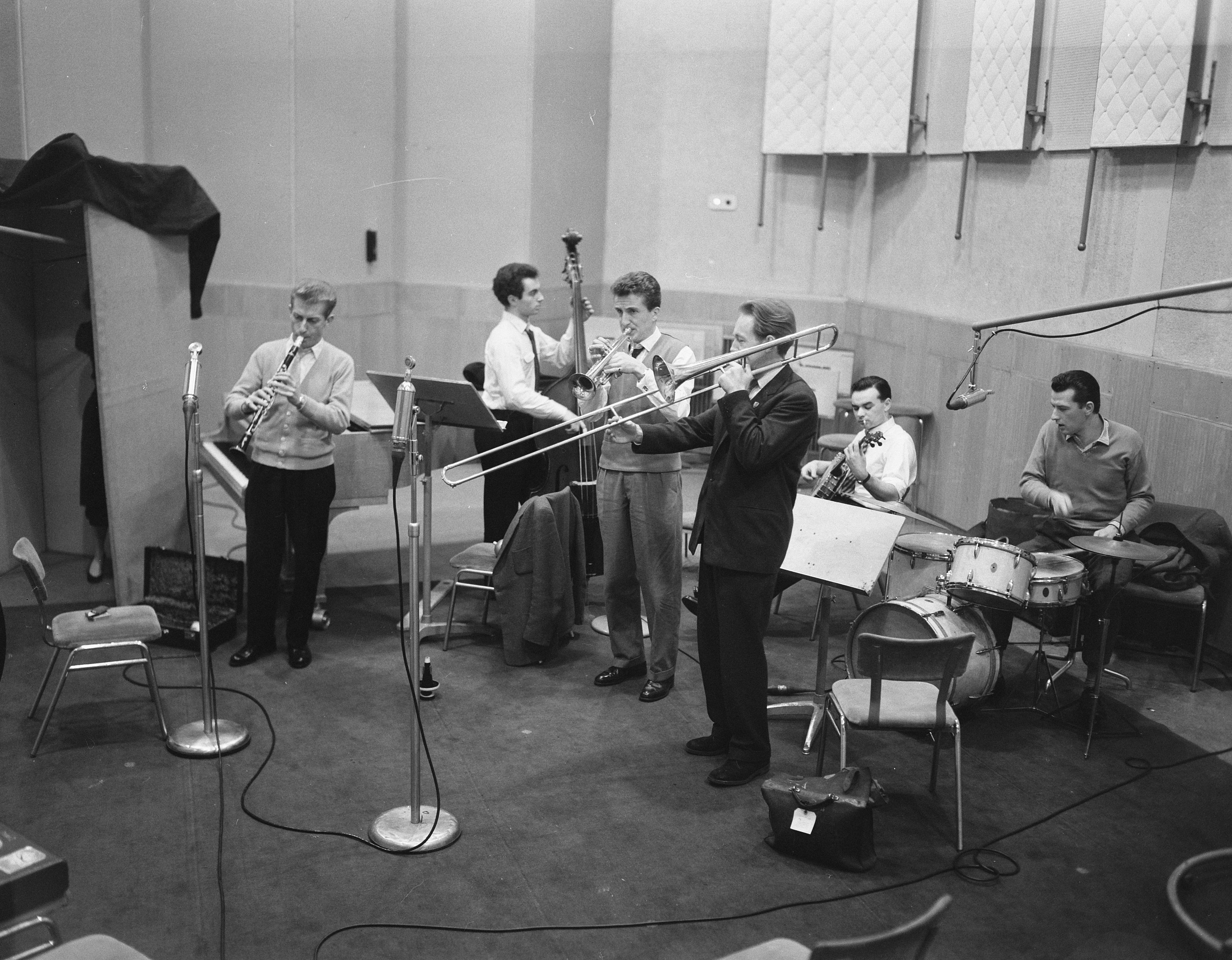
Monty Sunshine (left) w. Chris Barber Band (Netherlands, February 1957)

Monty Sunshine (born Monty Hyman Sonnenscheim; 9 April 1928 – 30 November 2010) was an English jazz clarinettist, who is known for his clarinet solo on the track "Petite Fleur", a million seller for the Chris Barber Jazz Band in 1959. During his career, Sunshine worked with the Eager Beavers, the Crane River Jazz Band, Beryl Bryden, George Melly, Chris Barber, Johnny Parker, Diz Disley and Donegan's Dancing Sunshine Band.

== Biography ==
He was born in Stepney, London, England. His great-great-grandparents arrived from Romania and had anglicised their surname to Sunshine.

Along with Lonnie Donegan, Jim Bray and Ron Bowden, formed the back line of what was the embryo Chris Barber Band. Ken Colyer was the first trumpet player, with Sunshine on clarinet, and the original 1953 band took the Colyer name until there was a split from Colyer in May 1954. Pat Halcox, who only turned the band down originally as he wanted to carry on his studies, took over the spot, and the band formally adopted the Chris Barber Jazz Band as its title.

The band quickly made an international reputation following their inaugural tour of Denmark, before their professional debut in the United Kingdom. Sunshine stayed with the band for several years, until he left in 1960, to be replaced by Ian Wheeler. He formed his own band, staying true to the original six-man line up, whilst Barber expanded his band membership to seven, then eight and finally to eleven.

It was noted in the September 22, 1962 issue of Disc that Laurie Chescoe had left the New Orleans Knights to join Monty Sunshine's Jazz Band where he was replacing Ron Darby who had left to take a day time job.

In January 1963, the British music magazine NME reported that the biggest trad jazz event to be staged in Britain had taken place at Alexandra Palace. The event included George Melly, Diz Disley, Acker Bilk, Chris Barber, Kenny Ball, Ken Colyer, Alex Welsh, Bob Wallis, Bruce Turner, Mick Mulligan and Sunshine.

Sunshine returned to play a reunion concert with the original Chris Barber Band at the Fairfield Halls, Croydon in June 1975. This was well received, and the band reformed once again for an international reunion tour in 1994. Sunshine retired from music around 2001. His discography is extensive, and CDs have been issued of recordings with Colyer and Barber, as well as with his own band.

He had a "day job" as a newspaper illustrator and also drew many cartoon style record album covers for various Trad Jazz bands.

He died in November 2010, at the age of 82.
