= Kenny Ball =

English jazz musician (1930–2013)

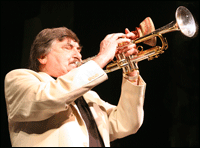

Background information
- Born: Kenneth Daniel Ball; 22 May 1930; Ilford, Essex, England
- Died: 7 March 2013 (aged 82) Basildon, Essex, England
- Genres: Jazz; Trad jazz
- Occupations: Trumpeter, bandleader
- Instruments: Trumpet, vocals
- Years active: 1953–2013
- Labels: Pye, Fontana; Kapp

Kenneth Daniel Ball (22 May 1930 – 7 March 2013) was an English jazz musician, best known as the bandleader, lead trumpet player and vocalist in Kenny Ball and His Jazzmen.

== Career ==
Ball was born in Ilford, Essex. At the age of 14 he left school to work as a clerk in an advertising agency, but also started taking trumpet lessons. He began his career as a semi-professional sideman in bands, whilst also working as a salesman and for the advertising agency. He turned professional in 1953 and played the trumpet in bands led by Sid Phillips, Charlie Galbraith, Eric Delaney and Terry Lightfoot before forming his own trad jazz band – Kenny Ball and his Jazzmen – in 1958. His Dixieland band was at the forefront of the early 1960s UK jazz revival.

In 1961 their recording of Cole Porter's "Samantha" (Pye 7NJ.2040 – released February 1961) became a hit, and they reached No. 2 at the end of 1961 on the UK Singles Chart, and in March 1962 on the Hot 100, with "Midnight in Moscow" (Pye 7NJ.2049 – released November 1961). The record sold over one million copies, earning gold disc status. Their next single "March of the Siamese Children" (Pye 7NJ.2051 – released February 1962), from The King and I, topped the pop music magazine New Musical Express's chart on 9 March 1962, further hits followed and such was their popularity in the UK that Ball was featured, along with Cliff Richard, Brenda Lee, Joe Brown, Craig Douglas and Frank Ifield, on the cover of the New Musical Express in July 1962, although in the United States they remained a "one-hit wonder". Ball appeared with his jazz band in the 1962 British musical movie It's Trad, Dad!, directed by Richard Lester.

In January 1963, New Musical Express reported that the biggest trad jazz event to be staged in Britain had taken place at Alexandra Palace. The event included George Melly, Diz Disley, Acker Bilk, Chris Barber, Alex Welsh, Ken Colyer, Monty Sunshine, Bob Wallis, Bruce Turner, Mick Mulligan and Ball. The same year, Ball was awarded the honorary citizenship of New Orleans, and appeared in the 1963 film Live It Up!, featuring Gene Vincent.

In 1968 the band appeared with Louis Armstrong during his last European tour. Ball later appeared on BBC Television's highly rated review of the 1960s music scene Pop Go The Sixties, performing "Midnight in Moscow" with his Jazzmen on the show's broadcast on BBC 1 on 31 December 1969. His continued success was aided by guest appearances on every edition of the first six series of the BBC's Morecambe and Wise Show. He later said that the peak of his career was when Kenny Ball and his Jazzmen played at the reception for the wedding of Prince Charles and Lady Diana.

Ball and his band enjoyed one of the longest unbroken spells of success for trad bands and his status rivals contemporaries Acker Bilk and Chris Barber. Their joint album, The Best of Ball, Barber and Bilk, reached No. 1 on the UK Albums Chart. He charted fourteen top 40 hit singles in the UK. All these releases were issued on the Pye record label. In 2001, Ball was part of the recording of an album on the Decca label. It featured Don Lusher, Acker Bilk, John Chilton and the Feetwarmers, John Dankworth, Humphrey Lyttelton and George Melly, and was entitled British Jazz Legends Together.

Ball continued to tour until shortly before his death, his last scheduled concert being with Acker Bilk and Chris Barber at Manchester's Bridgewater Hall on 21 February 2013. He died at Basildon Hospital, Essex, where he was being treated for pneumonia.

Since 2018, the band has continued in the form of a show titled Kenny Ball's Greatest Hits, which is produced by trombonist Ian Bateman, who played many times with the band in its later years as deputy for John Bennett and then under the leadership of Kenny's son, Keith. The show features musicians who were either in Kenny's band or were involved in the 3B's shows.

== The Jazzmen ==
The line-up changed greatly over the years, but the following personnel were in situ when the musical ensemble was at its commercial peak:

- Kenny Ball (trumpet); died 2013
- John Bennett (trombone), still in the line-up at the time of Ball's death
- Dave Jones (founder member clarinet until 1967)
- Andy Cooper (clarinet); died 2026
- Ron Weatherburn / Johnny Parker / Hugh Ledigo (piano)
- Paddy Lightfoot (banjo)
- Ron Bowden (drums)
- Vic Pitt / John Benson (bass, bass guitar)
- John Fenner (guitar, banjo)

The personnel of the Jazzmen at the time of Ball's death were:

- Keith Ball (bandleader and vocalist)
- Ben Cummings (trumpet)
- John Bennett (trombone and founder member of the band with Ball in 1958)
- Julian Marc Stringle (clarinet, replacing Andy Cooper in Summer of 2012)
- Hugh Ledigo (piano)
- Bill Coleman (double bass)
- Nick Millward (drums)
- Syd Appleton (sound technician and tour manager)

== Discography ==
=== Chart singles ===
Year	Single	Chart Positions	
Year	Single	US Pop	UK
1961	"Samantha"	–	13
1961	"I Still Love You All"	–	24
1961	"Someday (You'll Be Sorry)"	–	28
1961	"Midnight in Moscow"	2	2
1962	"March of the Siamese Children"	88	4
1962	"The Green Leaves of Summer"	87	7
1962	"So Do I"	–	14
1962	"The Pay Off"	–	23
1963	"Sukiyaki"	–	10
1963	"Casablanca"	–	21
1963	"Rondo"	–	24
1963	"Acapulco 1922"	–	27
1964	"Hello Dolly"	–	30
1967	"When I'm Sixty-Four"	–	43

=== Albums ===
- Invitation to the Ball – Pye Records – 1960
- Kenny Ball and His Jazzmen – Pye Jazz – 1961
- Gary Miller and Kenny Ball and His Jazzmen – Gary on the Ball – Pye Records – 1961
- The Kenny Ball Show – Pye Jazz – 1962
- Recorded Live! Kenny Ball and His Jazzmen – Kapp Records – 1962
- Midnight in Moscow – Kapp Records – 1962 (No. 13, US albums chart)
- The Big Ones – Kenny Ball Style – Pye Jazz – 1963
- The Big Ones Kenny Ball Style – Kapp Records – 1963
- Tribute to Tokyo – Pye Jazz – 1964
- Hello Dolly and 14 Other Big Hits – Pye Golden Guinea Records – 1964
- Kenny Ball & His Jazzmen in Berlin – Amiga – 1969
- King of the Swingers – Fontana Records – 1969
- At the Jazz Band Ball – Marble Arch Records – 1970
- Kenny Ball and His Jazzmen in Berlin 2 – Amiga – 1970
- Let's All Sing a Happy Song – Pye Records – 1973
- Saturday Night at the Mill – Spiral Records – 1977
- In Concert – Nevis – 1978
- Cheers! – Ronco – 1979
- Play the Movie Greats – Music for Pleasure – 1987
- Lighting Up the Town – Intersound – 1990
- Kenny Ball and His Jazzmen – Live in Concert
- Kenny Ball and His Jazzmen – The Golden Collection – 2007
- Kenny Ball and the Jive Aces: Happy Happy Christmas – 2009
- Kenny Ball's Golden Hits- Mode Disques – (unknown)
- Hello Dolly – Golden Hour – (unknown)
- King of the Swingers – Contour – (unknown)

=== Compilation albums ===
- Kenny Ball's Golden Hits – Marble Arch Records – 1966
- The Sound Of Kenny Ball – Marble Arch Records – 1968
- Golden Hour of Kenny Ball and His Jazzmen – Golden Hour – 1970
- Motoring Melodies of Kenny Ball and His Jazzmen – Pye tape-only compilation – 1973
- Kenny Ball and His Jazzmen, Chris Barber and His Jazz Band, Mr. Acker Bilk and His Paramount Jazz Band – The Best of Ball, Barber and Bilk – Pye Golden Guinea Records – 1975

=== Singles and EPs ===
- "Midnight in Moscow" – Pye Jazz – 1961
- "I Still Love You All" – Pye Jazz – 1961
- "Kenny's Big 4" – Pye Records – 1961
- "Samantha" – Pye Records – 1961
- "Kenny Ball Hit Parade" – Pye Jazz – 1961
- "Kenny Ball Plays" – Pye Records – 1962
- "So Do I" – Pye Jazz – 1962
- "Midnight in Moscow" – Disques Vogue – 1962
- "Sukiyaki" / "Hazelmere" – Vogue, Pye Records – 1962
- "It's Trad, Dad!" (Kenny Ball and His Jazzmen / Bob Wallis and His Storeyville Jazzmen) – Pye Jazz – 1962
- "Kenny Ball Plays" – Pye Jazz – 1962
- "Sukiyaki" – Pye Jazz – 1962
- "The Pay-Off" – Pye Jazz – 1962
- "March of the Siamese Children" – Pye Jazz – 1962
- "The Green Leaves of Summer" – Pye Jazz – 1962
- "Washington Square" – Pye Jazz – 1963
- "Rondo" – Pye Jazz – 1963
- "Morocco '64" – Pye Records – 1963
- "Serate Di Mosca" / "My Mother's Eyes" – Pye Records – 1963
- "Casablanca" – Pye Jazz – 1963
- "Hello Dolly" – Pye Jazz – 1964
- "Rosie" (Max Bygraves / Kenny Ball and His Jazzmen) – Pye Records – 1967
- "Shake 'em Up and Let 'em Roll" – Pye Records – 1970
- "Listen to My Song" – Pye Records – 1971
- "I'd Like to Be a Friend to You" – Pye Records – 1972
- "Titillating Tango" – Pye Records – 1976
- "March of the Siamese Children" – Pye Records – 1979
- "I Still Love You All" – Vogue – 1981
- "When I'm Sixty-Four" – Astor – (unknown)
- "Marocco '64" – Vogue Schallplatten – (unknown)
- "Cast Your Fate to the Wind" – Eric Records – (unknown)
- "Acapulco 1922" – Pye Jazz – (unknown)
- "So I Do" / "Cornet Chop Suey" – Pye Jazz – (unknown)
- "Brazil" – Pye Records – (unknown)
