= Mick Mulligan =

English jazz trumpeter and bandleader (1928–2006)

- Born: Peter Sidney Mulligan; 24 January 1928; Harrow, Middlesex, England
- Died: 20 December 2006 (aged 78) Chichester, West Sussex, England
- Genres: Jazz; Trad jazz
- Occupations: Musician; Bandleader
- Instrument: Trumpet
- Years active: 1948–2005

Peter Sidney "Mick" Mulligan (24 January 1928 – 20 December 2006) was an English jazz trumpeter and bandleader, best known for his presence on the trad jazz scene.

== Biography ==
He was born in Harrow, Middlesex, England. Mulligan began playing trumpet while a student at Merchant Taylors' School, Northwood. He entered into the family wine company, but became an alcoholic and eventually was pushed out of the business by his relatives. He then formed his Magnolia Jazz Band in 1948. He met George Melly soon after that and they performed together for many years becoming close associates. In Melly's memoir Owning Up, published in 1965, he detailed many of the pair's drunken and scandalous outings which had made them regular tabloid figures in the 1950s.

Mulligan's orchestra included Roy Crimmins, Ian Christie, and Archie Semple; it rivalled Humphrey Lyttelton's band in popularity on the British trad jazz circuit. While he booked excellent side men, Mulligan was not a top-flight musician and his own playing was often hampered by intoxication; their recording legacy is spotty because their releases were irregular and generally for small labels. Mulligan broke up his band in 1953 but reformed it a year and a half later, continuing with the new group in 1962; Melly also sang along with this ensemble. In January 1963, the British music magazine NME reported that the biggest trad jazz event to be staged in Britain had taken place at Alexandra Palace. The event included Melly, Diz Disley, Acker Bilk, Chris Barber, Kenny Ball, Ken Colyer, Monty Sunshine, Bob Wallis, Bruce Turner, Alex Welsh, and Mulligan.

By the early 1960s, rock and roll had whittled the enthusiasm for trad jazz to nearly nothing and Mulligan ended the Magnolia Jazz Band to manage Melly, who was launching a solo career. He played occasionally into the 1970s, but mostly retired to run a grocery store in Easebourne, near Midhurst, West Sussex.

== Personal life and death ==
His first wife, Pamela, died in 1976, and four years later he married Tessa Howard. Later in life he became interested in horse racing, and owned or part-owned several race horses, including the prize-winning horse, 'Forever My Lord'. He suffered a stroke aged 78 and died in Chichester, West Sussex in December 2006. He is survived by his second wife Tessa, as well as his two sons and two daughters from his first marriage, and by three stepdaughters.
