= Lennie Hastings =

English jazz drummer

- Born: Leonard Hastings; 5 January 1927; Carshalton, Surrey, England
- Died: 14 July 1978 (aged 51) Isleworth, Middlesex, England
- Genres: Jazz; Dixieland
- Occupation: Musician
- Instruments: Drums
- Years active: 1942–1978

Leonard "Lennie" Hastings (5 January 1927 – 14 July 1978) was an English jazz drummer.

== Biography ==
Hastings started out playing in military bands during World War II in the 1940s, which included Micky Bryan's Rug Cutters in 1942. He then played with Freddy Randall (December 1950 – November 1953 and June – August 1954) and Alex Welsh (December 1954 – January 1957). Following these engagements, Hastings played in local combos and led an ensemble in Düsseldorf and then played with Nat Gonella briefly before rejoining Welsh. He was Welsh's drummer for well over a decade, during which time he also recorded with Earl Hines, Rex Stewart, Eddie Davis, Ben Webster, and Bill Coleman. He was particularly popular in TV appearances with the Alex Welsh band, and was known as "Herr" Lennie Hastings dressed in his trademark lederhosen and orange wig with false monocle, and noted for ending numbers playing a drum break and waving his arms with a shout of "Oo yah Oo yah" whilst holding his drumsticks high above his head.

== Recordings and television appearances ==
In 1961, a single was released on Columbia Records called "Auf Wiedersen, My Dear" b/w "One, Two, Drink Up" on Columbia 45-DB 4675. He made two appearances on the BBC2 television programme, Jazz 625, both in 1964 playing drums alongside fellow musicians Kenny Baker, George Chisholm and Tony Coe as well as Alex Welsh.

== Later years and death ==
In 1972, he left Welsh's group due to failing health and formed his own Oo-Yah Band. Personnel at the start were Nick Stevenson (trumpet), Ron Brown (trombone), Malcolm Everson (clarinet and baritone saxophone), a young 15-year-old Martin Taylor (guitar), Jamie Evans (piano) and Peter Skivington (bass). Due to his reputation, Hastings' band attracted guest appearances from musicians including George Chisholm on trombone, Beryl Bryden on washboard and Betty Smith on vocals and saxophone. However, the effort of running a band proved too much for him and, despite an encouraging reception from audiences, the band petered out after eight or nine months.

He recorded later in the decade with Brian Lemon, Stan Greig, Dave Shepherd, and Fred Hunt. He played at the Pizza Express Jazz Club, a London club, in his later years, and toured with Wild Bill Davison and Ruby Braff. He led his own quartet shortly before his death in 1978, aged 51.

== Other sources ==
- Henley/Kernfeld, "Lennie Hastings". Grove Jazz online.
