= George Melly =

English jazz and blues singer, critic, writer, and lecturer (1926–2007)

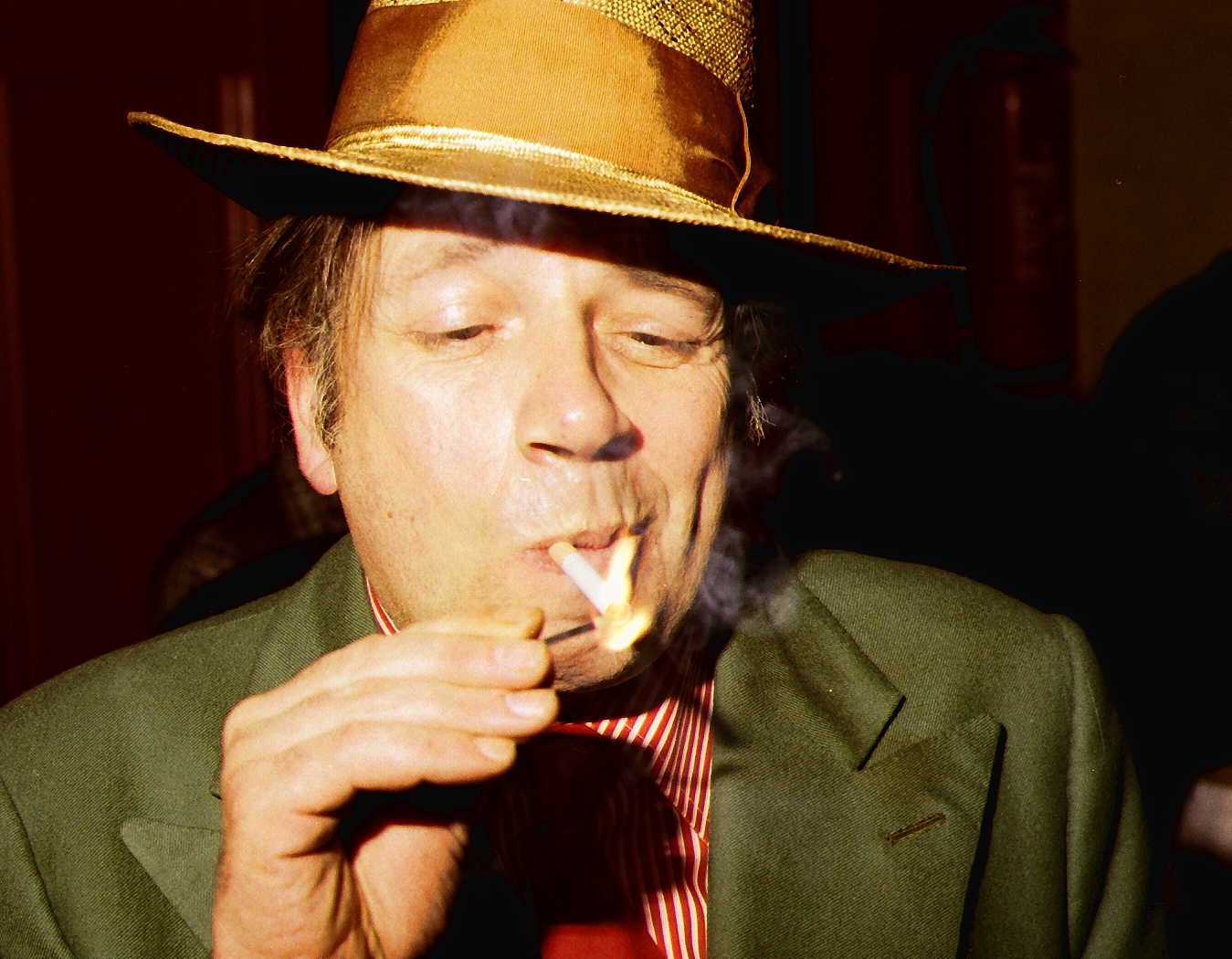
- Melly, circa 1978

Background information
- Born: Alan George Heywood Melly; 17 August 1926; Liverpool, Lancashire, England
- Died: 5 July 2007 (aged 80) London, England
- Genres: Jazz; blues
- Occupations: Lecturer; critic; writer
- Instrument: Vocals
- Years active: 1946–2007
- Label: WSM
- Website: georgemelly.com

Alan George Heywood Melly (17 August 1926 – 5 July 2007) was an English jazz and blues singer, critic, writer, and lecturer. From 1965 to 1973, he was a film and television critic for The Observer; he also lectured on art history, with an emphasis on surrealism.

== Early life and career ==
Melly was born at The Grange, St Michael's Hamlet, Toxteth, Liverpool, Lancashire, the elder son and eldest of three children of wool broker Francis Heywood Melly and (Edith) Maud, née Isaac. His mother was Jewish. Melly was a descendant of the shipowner and Liberal MP George Melly. He was also a relative of the philanthropist Emma Holt, of Sudley House Liverpool; her mother had married Melly's great-grandfather.

Melly was educated at Stowe School, Buckinghamshire. During his time at Stowe, he discovered his interest in modern art, jazz and blues. Melly started coming to terms with his sexuality while attending the school.

Melly was an atheist. Interviewed by Nigel Farndale in 2005, Melly said: "I don't understand people panicking about death. It's inevitable. I'm an atheist; you'd think it would make it worse, but it doesn't. I've done quite a lot in the world, not necessarily of great significance, but I have done it."

== Interest in surrealist art ==
Melly once said that he may have been drawn to surrealism by a particular experience he had during his teenage years. A frequent visitor to Liverpool's Sefton Park near his home, he often entered its tropical Palm House and there chatted to wounded soldiers from a nearby military hospital. It was the incongruity of this sight, men smoking among the exotic plants, dressed in their hospital uniforms and usually missing a limb, that he felt he later recognised in the work of the Surrealists.

He joined the Royal Navy at the end of the Second World War because, as he quipped to the recruiting officer, the uniforms were "so much nicer". As he related in his autobiography Rum, Bum and Concertina, he was crestfallen to discover that he would not be sent to a ship and was thus denied the "bell-bottom" uniform he desired. Instead he received desk duty and wore the other Navy uniform, described as "the dreaded fore-and-aft". Later, however, he did go to sea but never saw action; he was almost court-martialled for distributing anarchist literature.

== Postwar life and career ==
After the war, Melly found work in a London surrealist gallery, working with E. L. T. Mesens and eventually drifted into the world of jazz, finding work with Mick Mulligan's Magnolia Jazz Band. This was a time (1948 onwards) when New Orleans and "New Orleans Revival" style jazz were very popular in Britain. In January 1963, the British music magazine NME reported that the biggest trad jazz event to be staged in Britain had taken place at Alexandra Palace. The event included Alex Welsh, Diz Disley, Acker Bilk, Chris Barber, Kenny Ball, Ken Colyer, Monty Sunshine, Bob Wallis, Bruce Turner, Mick Mulligan and Melly.

Nuts (album cover) by George Melly & The Feetwarmers

In 1956 Melly became a writer on the Daily Mail's satirical newspaper strip Flook, illustrated by Trog. He continued this until 1971. Melly retired from jazz in 1962 when he became a film critic for The Observer. He was also scriptwriter on the 1967 satirical film Smashing Time. The period from 1948 until 1963 is described in Owning Up. Melly returned to jazz in the early 1970s with John Chilton's Feetwarmers, a partnership that ended in 2003. He later sang with Digby Fairweather's band. Melly released six albums in the 1970s including Nuts in 1972 and Son of Nuts the next year. He wrote a light column, Mellymobile, in Punch magazine describing their tours.

Melly was an Honorary Associate of the National Secular Society and a Distinguished Supporter of the British Humanist Association. He was President of the BHA 1972–4, and was also an Honorary Associate of the Rationalist Association. Melly was also a member of the Max Miller Appreciation Society. On 1 May 2005, Melly joined Roy Hudd, Norman Wisdom, and others to unveil a statue of Miller in Brighton.

His singing style, in particular for the blues, was strongly influenced by his idol, Bessie Smith. While many British musicians of the time treated jazz and blues with almost religious solemnity, Melly rejoiced in their more bawdy side, and this was reflected in his choice of songs and exuberant stage performances. He recorded a track called "Old Codger" with The Stranglers in 1978, the lyrics of which were specially written for him by then band member, Hugh Cornwell.

Melly, who was bisexual, moved from strictly homosexual relationships in his teens and twenties to largely heterosexual relationships from his thirties onwards. He married twice and had a child from each marriage, though his first child Pandora was not known to be his until she was much older.

He married his second wife, Diana Moynihan (née Dawson), in 1963 and they lived on Gloucester Crescent in Camden Town. She brought with her two children (Candy and Patrick) from two previous marriages. Patrick died from a heroin overdose in his twenties. Their own son, Tom, was born two days after the wedding. Diana published an autobiography, Take a Girl Like Me, describing their life and open marriage together, in 2005.

== Scethrog ==
George and Diana Melly had a country retreat, Scethrog Tower in the Usk Valley, between 1971 and 1999. This was somewhere Melly could escape the jazz world and indulge his love of fishing on the River Usk. Jazz followed him, and this led to a series of celebrated performances in the area and in the valleys. In 1984, the Brecon Jazz Festival was conceived by a group of jazz enthusiasts who gained widespread support from the local community. Melly was the first musician to be contracted for the opening festival and remained a supporter until his death. He was a factor in the festival's success and served as its president in 1991.

As well as being the President of the Contemporary Arts Society for Wales, Melly was a contemporary art collector. His passion for surrealist art continued throughout his life and he lectured and wrote extensively on the subject. His passion for fly-fishing never dwindled and in later life he sold several important paintings (by Magritte and Picasso) enabling him to buy a mile of land by the River Usk. In 2000 he published Hooked!, a book on fly-fishing.

== Later years and death ==
Melly was still active in music, journalism, and lecturing on surrealism and other aspects of modern art until his death, despite worsening health problems such as vascular dementia, incipient emphysema, and lung cancer. His encouragement and support to gallery owner Michael Budd led to a posthumous exhibition for the modern abstract artist François Lanzi.

Melly suffered from environmental hearing loss because of long-term exposure to stage sound systems, and his hearing in both ears became increasingly poor. Despite these problems, Melly would often joke that he found some parts of his ailing health to be enjoyable. He often equated his dementia to a quite amusing LSD trip, and took a lot of pleasure from his deafness, which he said made many boring conversations more interesting. On Sunday 10 June 2007, Melly made an appearance, announced as his last ever performance, at the 100 Club in London. This was on the occasion of a fund-raising event to benefit the charity supporting his carers.

He died at his London home of lung cancer and emphysema (which he had for the last two years of his life), aged 80, on 5 July 2007. His humanist funeral was held at the West London Crematorium, in Kensal Green. The hearse was led by a jazz band, including Kenny Ball on trumpet, playing a New Orleans funeral march. His cardboard coffin was covered with old snapshots and cartoons of Melly by his friends, as well as hand-drawn decorations.

On 17 February 2008 BBC Two broadcast George Melly's Last Stand (produced by Walker George Films), an intimate portrayal of Melly's last months. His sister Andrée Melly was an actress, who lived in Ibiza with her husband, Oscar Quitak. In 2018 writer, musician and film maker Chris Wade made a documentary about Melly entitled The Certainty of Hazard, featuring his wife Diana, son Tom, and various friends and associates.

Diana Melly died on 2 February 2025, at the age of 87.

== Bibliography ==
- I, Flook (cartoon strip in the Daily Mail with Wally Fawkes illustrating, 1962).
- Owning Up (autobiography, covering his career during the trad-jazz boom, 1965)
- Flook by Trog: A Flook's Eye View of the Sixties (selection of four Melly-scripted stories, with an introduction by Laurie Lee, 1970)
- Revolt into Style: The Pop Arts in Britain (1970)
- Rum, Bum and Concertina (autobiography, covering his years in the Navy in the 1940s, 1977)
- The Media Mob (with Barry Fantoni, 1980)
- A Tribe of One: Great Naive and Primitive Painters of the British Isles (1981)
- Great Lovers (1981, text only—art and research by Walter Dorin)
- Swans Reflecting Elephants: A Biography of Edward James (1982)
- Mellymobile (1982)
- Scouse Mouse (autobiography, covering his childhood in Liverpool, 1984)
- It's All Writ Out for You: Life and Work of Scottie Wilson (1986)
- Paris and the Surrealists (1991)
- Don't Tell Sybil: An Intimate Memoir of E. L. T. Mesens (1997)
- Hooked! Fishing Memories (2000)
- Slowing Down (memoir, 2005)

== Books partly about Melly ==
- Take a Girl Like Me (autobiography by his wife, Diana Melly, 2005)
- Hot Jazz, Warm Feet (autobiography of his long-time colleague John Chilton, 2007)
- On the Road with George Melly (memoir by Digby Fairweather, 2013)
- The Life and Work of George Melly (book on Melly's books and music, written by Chris Wade, 2018)

== Selected discography ==
=== Singles ===
George Melly Trio

- "Rock Island Line" b/w "Send Me to the 'Lectric Chair" (Tempo A96) (1951)

George Melly With Alex Welsh and his Dixielanders

- "Frankie and Johnny" b/w "I'm Down in the Dumps" (Decca 45-F 10457) (1952)

George Melly

- "Kitchen Man" b/w "Jazzbo Brown from Memphis Town" (Tempo A104)

George Melly With Mick Mulligan and his Band

- "Kingdom Coming" b/w "I'm a Ding Dong Daddy" (Decca 45-F 10763) (1956)

George Melly With Mick Mulligan's Jazz Band

- "Jenny's Ball" b/w "Muddy Water" (Tempo A 144) (July 1956)

George Melly With Mick Mulligan and his Band

- "Waiting For a Train" b/w Railroadin' Man (Decca 45-F 10779)

George Melly With Mick Mulligan and his Band

- "Heebie Jeebies" b/w "My Canary Has Circles Under His Eyes" (Decca 45-F 10806)

George Melly

- "Black Bottom" b/w "Magnolia" (Decca 45-F-10840) (1957)
- "Abdul Abulbul Amir" b/w "Get Away, Old Man, Get Away" (Decca F-11115) (February 1959)
- "Ise a Muggin'" b/w "Run Come See Jerusalem" (Pye 7N 15353) (February 1960)
- "Monkey and the Baboon" b/w "Funny Feathers" (Columbia 45-DB 4664) (1963?)

George Melly and the Feetwarmers

- "Nuts" b/w "Sam Jones Blues" (Warner Brothers K16249) (February 1973)

George Melly with John Chilton's Feetwarmers

- "Good Time George" b/w "My Canary Has Circles Under His Eyes" (Warner Brothers K16533) (March 1974)

George Melly with John Chilton's Feetwarmers and His Orchestra

- "Billy Fisher" b/w "Punchdrunk Mama" (CBS 2405) (May 1974)

George Melly with John Chilton's Feetwarmers

- "Ain't Misbehavin'" b/w "My Canary Has Circles Under His Eyes" (Warner Brothers K16533) (March 1975)

George Melly with John Chilton's Feetwarmers and Other Friends

- "I Long To Get It On Down" b/w "Inflation Blues" (Warner Brothers K16574) (June 1975)

George Melly

- "Pennies from Heaven" b/w "Punch and Judy" (Reprise Records K14453) (November 1976)
- "Makin' Whoopee" b/w "Everybody Loves My Baby" (PRT Records 7P 268) (1983)

George Melly with John Chilton's Feetwarmers

- "Masculine Women, Feminine Men" b/w "It's The Bluest Kind of Blues" (PRT Records 7P 318) (1984)
- "Hometown" b/w "I Won't Grow Old" (PRT Records 7P 368) (1986)
- "Anything Goes" b/w "September Song" (PYS 14) (1988)

=== Extended players ===
George Melly with Mick Mulligan's Jazz Band

- George Melly (Tempo EXA 41) (July 1956): "Jenny's Ball" / "Organ Grinder" / "Muddy Water" / "You've Got The Right Key But The Wrong Keyhole"
- George Melly Sings Doom (Tempo EXA 46) (November 1956): "Send Me To The 'Lectric Chair" / "Cemetery Blues" / "Blue Spirit Blues" / "Death Letter"
- Nothing Personal. George Melly Sings The Blues (Decca DFE 6552) (December 1958): "Michigan Water Blues" / "Ma Rainey's Black Bottom" / "St. Louis Blues" / "Spider Crawl"

George Melly

- George Melly Sings Songs Of Frank Crumit (Decca DFE 6557) (1959): "Abdul Abulbul Amir" / "Get Away Old Man, Get Away" / "Granny's Old Armchair" / "Donald The Dub (The Dirty Little Pill)"
- The Psychological Significance Of Animal Symbolism in American Negro Folk Music And All That Jazz (Columbia SEG 8093) (1961): "Monkey And The Baboon" / "Put It Right Here" / "Black Mare Blues" / "Funny Feathers"

=== LPs ===
George Melly

- Nothing Personal (Decca) (1958)

Mick Mulligan's Magnolia Jazz Band With George Melly

- Meet Mick Mulligan (Pye NJ 21) (1959). Re-released on LP Pye NSPL 18424 (1973) and possibly on CD Hallmark (2011)

George Melly

- Nuts (Warner Bros. K46188) (1972)
- Son of Nuts (Warner Bros. K46269) (1973)
- It's George (Warner Bros. K56087) (1974)
- Melly Is at It Again (Reprise K54084) (1976)
- Melly Sings Hoagy (Pye NSPL 18557) (1978)
- George Melly Sings Fats Waller (Pye NSPL 18602) (1979)
- Let's Do It (PRT Records N131) (1980)
- Like Sherry Wine (PRT Records N140) (1981)
- Makin' Whoopie (PRT Records N147) (1982)
- The Many Moods of Melly (PRT Records N6550) (1984)
- Running Wild (Precision Records) (1986)
- Anything Goes (PRT Records PYL15) (1988)
- Puttin' On the Ritz (Legacy Records LLP 135) (1990)

=== LP compilations ===
- The World of George Melly (The Fifties) (Decca SPA 288) (1973)
- Unforgettable 16 Golden Classics (Castle UNLP 014)

=== Original CDs ===
- The Many Moods of Melly (PRT Records N6550) (1984)
- Running Wild (Precision Records CDN 6562) (1986)
- Anything Goes (PRT Records PYC 15) (1988)
- Puttin' On the Ritz (Legacy Records LLCD 135) (1990)
- Frankie and Johnny (D Sharp DSH CD 7001) (1992)
- Best of Live (D Sharp DSH LCD 7019) (1995)
- Anything Goes (Pulse PLS CD 112) (1996). Compilation CD with 11 of the 12 tracks from the original LP and 11 additional tracks from the LP Puttin' On the Ritz
- Singing and Swinging the Blues (Robinwood RWP 0019) (2003). George Melly and Digby Fairweather's Half Dozen
- The Ultimate Melly (Candid CCD 79843) (2006). George Melly and Digby Fairweather's Half Dozen
- Farewell Blues (Lake LACD 250) (2007). George Melly and Digby Fairweather's Half Dozen

=== CD compilations and reissues ===
- Golden Hour of George Melly (Knight Records) (1994). Compilation of Pye/PRT Recordings'.
- The Best of George Melly (Kaz 22) (1992). Compilation of Pye recordings, with both John Chilton and Mick Mulligan'.
- The Best of George Melly (TrueTrax TRT CD 160) (1994). Compilation CD with tracks from Anything Goes and Puttin' On the Ritz
- Meet Mick Mulligan and George Melly (Lake LACD66) (1996). Reissue of Meet Mick Mulligan, with four additional tracks by Mick Mulligan
- Ravers (Lake LACD150) (2001). Mick Mulligan and His Jazz Band, featuring George Melly. Includes Melly's singles from 1956
- Goodtime George (Spectrum 544 465–2) (2001/6?). Retitled reissue of The World of George Melly with additional tracks
- The Pye Jazz Anthology (Castle CMDDD 483) (2002)
- Live (Lake LACD176) (2002). Mick Mulligan and His Jazz Band with George Melly (on some tracks). Reissue of the band's cuts on the Tempo LPs Third British Festival of Jazz (Tempo TAP LP 11) (1956) and Jazz at The Railway Arms (Tempo TAP LP 14) (1957)
- Nuts / Son of Nuts (Warner Brothers 6751781) (2004)
- First and Last (for dementia GMFDAND01) (2008) Career spanning anthology (with some previously unreleased tracks) produced posthumously
- Nothing Personal (Lake LACD 265) (2008). Reissue of Nothing Personal, with additional material
- Sporting Life (Hallmark) (2011). Retitled reissue of The World of George Melly
- George Melly Sings Doom (Cherry Red El ACMEM273CD) (2014). Compilation of Decca recordings
