= Chris Barber =

English bandleader and trombonist (1930–2021)

Chris Barber OBE
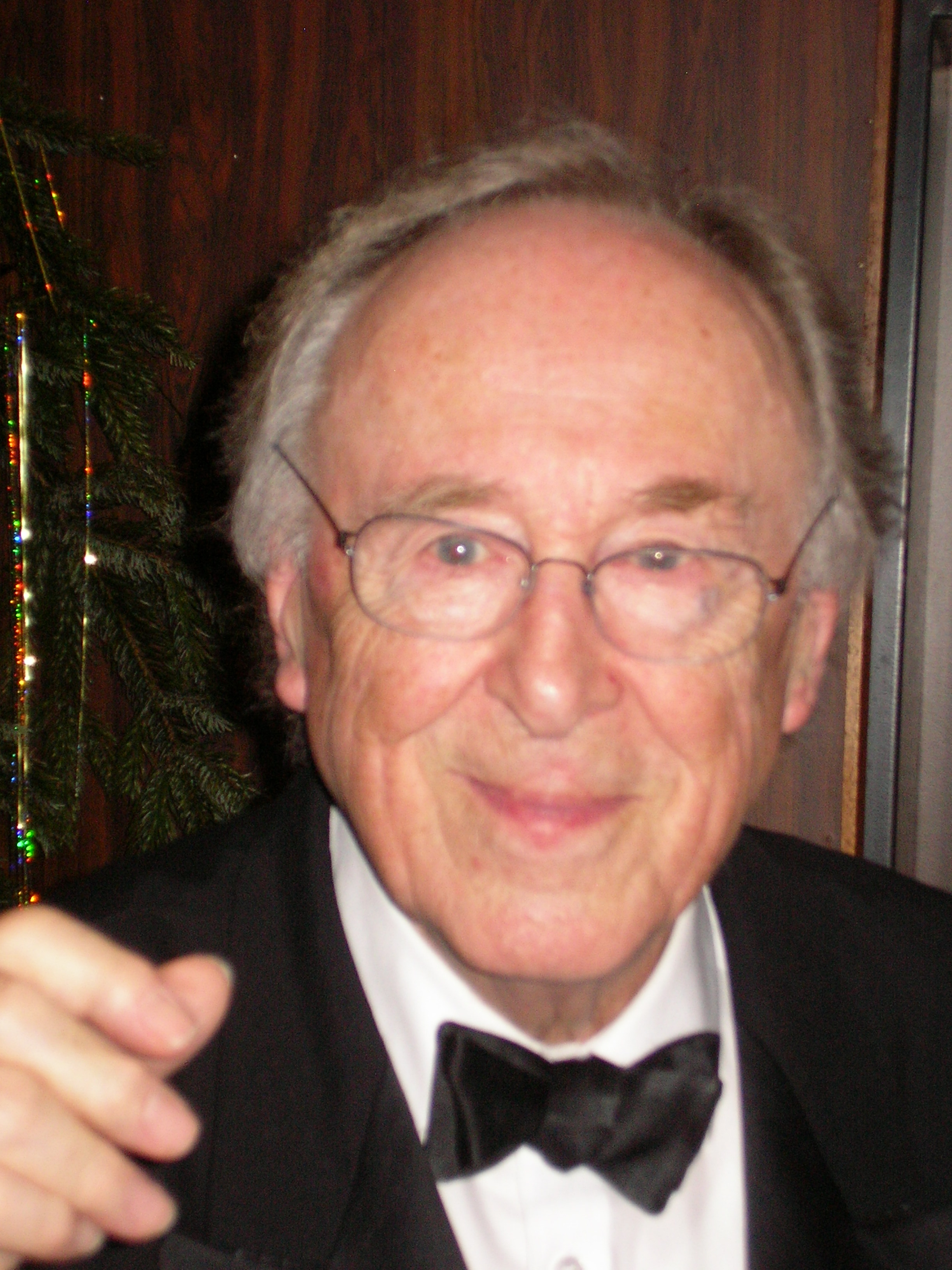
- Barber in 2010

Background information
- Born: Donald Christopher Barber; 17 April 1930; Welwyn Garden City, Hertfordshire, England
- Died: 2 March 2021 (aged 90)
- Genres: Skiffle; ragtime; swing; blues; trad jazz; folk
- Occupations: Musician; songwriter; bandleader
- Instruments: Trombone, double bass
- Years active: 1950-2019
- Labels: Decca; Tempo; Columbia (EMI); Pye; Lake
- Website: chrisbarber.net

Donald Christopher Barber (17 April 1930 – 2 March 2021) was an English jazz musician, best known as a bandleader and trombonist. He helped many musicians with their careers and had a UK top twenty trad jazz hit with "Petite Fleur" in 1959. These musicians included the blues singer Ottilie Patterson, who was at one time his wife, and Lonnie Donegan, whose appearances with Barber triggered the skiffle craze of the mid-1950s and who had his first transatlantic hit, "Rock Island Line", while with Barber's band. He provided an audience for Donegan and, later, Alexis Korner, and sponsored African-American blues musicians to visit Britain, making Barber a significant figure in launching the British rhythm and blues and "beat boom" of the 1960s.

== Early life ==
Barber was born in Welwyn Garden City, Hertfordshire, on 17 April 1930.

His father, Donald Barber, was an insurance statistician who a few years later became secretary of the Socialist League, while his mother was a headmistress. His parents were left-leaning, his father having been taught by John Maynard Keynes, while his mother became, in Barber's words, "the only socialist mayor of Canterbury". Barber started learning the violin when he was seven years old. He was educated at Hanley Castle Grammar School, near Malvern, Worcestershire, to the age of 15, and started to develop an interest in jazz.

After the end of the war, he attended St Paul's School in London, and began visiting clubs to hear jazz groups. He then spent three years at the Guildhall School of Music, and started playing music with friends he met there, including Alexis Korner.

== 1950s ==
In 1950, Barber formed the New Orleans Jazz Band, a non-professional group of up to eight musicians, including Korner on guitar and Barber on double bass, to play both trad jazz and blues tunes. He had trained as an actuary, but decided to leave his job in an insurance office in 1951, and the following year became a professional musician.

Barber and clarinetist Monty Sunshine formed a band in late 1952, with trumpeter Pat Halcox among others, began playing in London clubs, and accepted an offer to play in Denmark in early 1953. Simultaneously, it was found that Halcox would be unable to travel but that Ken Colyer, who had been visiting New Orleans, was available. Colyer joined the band, which then took the name Ken Colyer's Jazzmen. The group also included Donegan, Jim Bray (bass), Ron Bowden (drums) and Barber on trombone. In April 1953 the band made its debut in Copenhagen, Denmark.

There Chris Albertson recorded several sides for the new Danish Storyville label, including some featuring only Sunshine (clarinet), Donegan (banjo) and Barber (bass) as the Monty Sunshine Trio. The bands played Dixieland jazz, and later ragtime, swing, blues and R&B. Pat Halcox returned on trumpet in 1954 when Colyer moved on after musical and personal differences with both Barber and Donegan, and the band became "The Chris Barber Band".

The band's first recording session in 1954 produced the LP New Orleans Joys, and included "Rock Island Line", performed by Donegan. When released as a single under Donegan's name, it became a hit, launching Donegan's solo career and the British skiffle boom. The Barber band recorded several In Concert LPs during the 1950s, regarded by critic Richie Unterberger as "captur[ing] the early Barber band in its prime.... [T]here's a certain crispness and liveliness to both the acoustics and the performances that make this in some ways preferable to their rather starchier studio recordings of the same era."

The short documentary film Momma Don't Allow, made in 1956, features the Chris Barber Band live with the Irish blues singer Ottilie Patterson in a north London trad jazz club. It captures the emerging 'youth culture' of that period. Barber married Patterson in 1959.

In 1959, the band's October 1956 recording of Sidney Bechet's "Petite Fleur", a clarinet solo by Monty Sunshine with Dick Smith on bass, Ron Bowden on drums and Dick Bishop on guitar, spent 24 weeks in the UK Singles Chart, making it to No. 3 and selling over one million copies, and was awarded a gold disc. After 1959, Barber toured the United States several times (where "Petite Fleur" charted at No. 5).

== 1960s ==
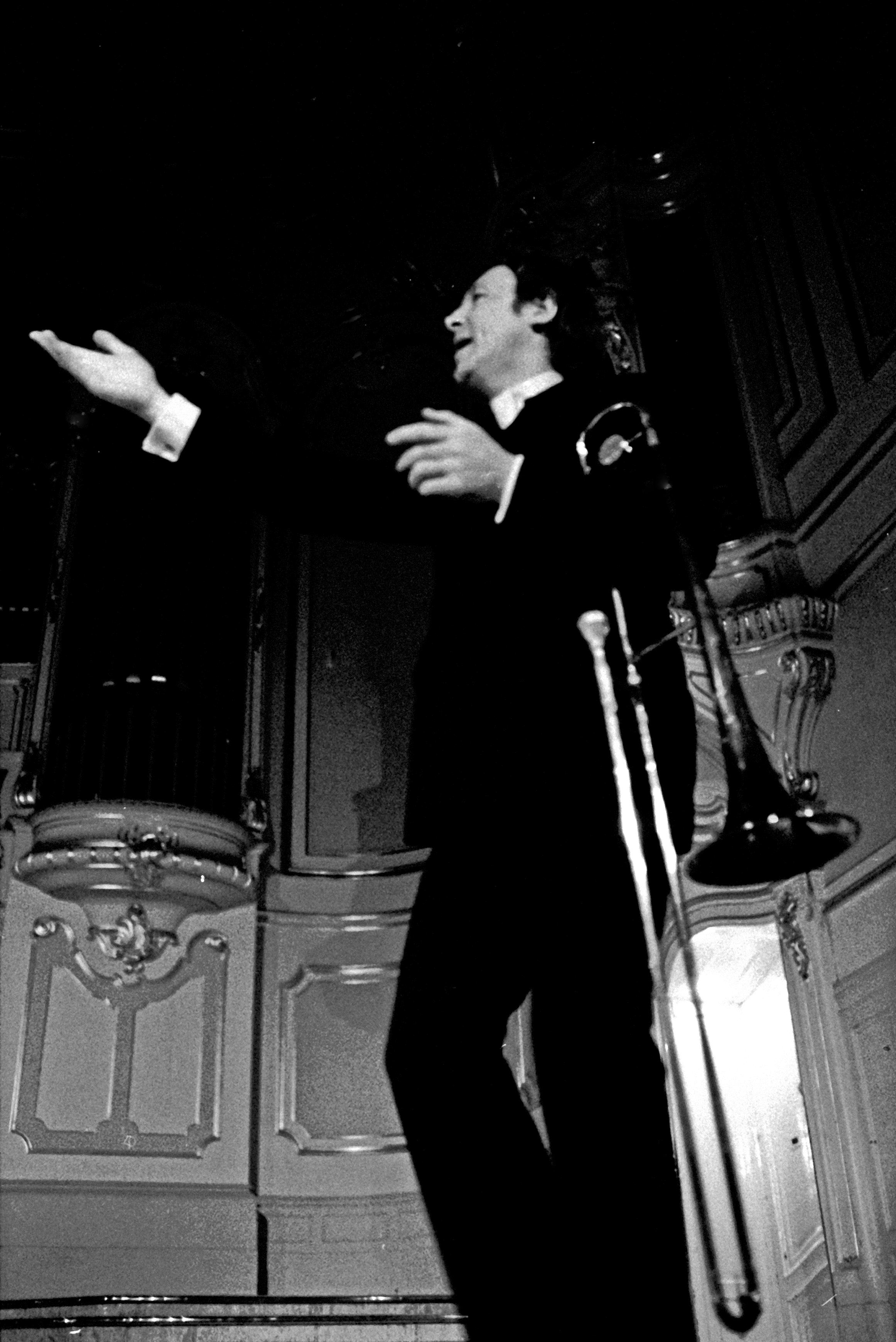
Barber performing in Hamburg, 1972

In the late 1950s and early 1960s, Barber was mainly responsible for arranging the first UK tours of blues artists Big Bill Broonzy, Sonny Terry and Brownie McGhee and Muddy Waters. This, with the encouragement of local enthusiasts such as Alexis Korner and John Mayall, sparked young musicians such as Peter Green, Eric Clapton and the Rolling Stones. British rhythm and blues powered the British Invasion of the US charts in the 1960s.

In January 1963, the British music magazine, NME reported the biggest trad jazz event in Britain at Alexandra Palace. It included George Melly, Diz Disley, Acker Bilk, Alex Welsh, Kenny Ball, Ken Colyer, Sunshine, Bob Wallis, Bruce Turner, Mick Mulligan and Barber.

Barber stunned traditionalists in 1964 by introducing blues guitarist John Slaughter into the line up who (apart from a break between April 1978 and August 1986 when Roger Hill took over the spot) played in the band until shortly before his death in 2010. Barber next added a second clarinet/saxophone and this line-up continued until 2000.

A recording of the Lennon–McCartney composition "Catswalk" can be heard, retitled "Cat Call", on The Songs Lennon and McCartney Gave Away. Written by Paul McCartney, the song was recorded in late July 1967 and released as a single in the UK on 20 October 1967.

In 1969, Barber signed up to the progressive Marmalade Records label and released the album Battersea Rain Dance, featuring both McCartney and Brian Auger. Throughout the 1960s The Chris Barber Band was very popular in Germany, including parts of communist eastern Europe. In 1968 they released the album Live in East Berlin.

== Later career ==
With guitarist Rory Gallagher, Barber and his band recorded the 1972 album Drat That Fratle Rat, described by Bob Stanley as an "unlikely but terrific trad jazz/blues rock fusion album". The band toured with the American clarinettist Russell Procope in 1976 and with Dr. John in 1981. Venturing into classical music, Barber commissioned and co-write a Concerto for Jazz Trombone in 1986 with Richard Hill, which was premiered behind the Berlin Wall at the Palast der Republik on 2 October 1986. He also recorded the album Under the Influence of Jazz with The London Gabrieli Brass Ensemble in 1991.

In 1998 Barber began to expand his band, partly so that he could play the music of the early Duke Ellington band, one of his favourites. He was joined by fellow trombonist/arranger Bob Hunt and added another clarinet/sax and trumpet. After his only 'Down Under Tour' of Australia and New Zealand in 2000 he permanently grew the band to 11 members, eventually renaming it The Big Chris Barber Band in 2001. This opened up the band to a broader range of music, although a spot was still reserved in the programme for the traditional six-man New Orleans line-up.

Barber published his autobiography Jazz Me Blues in 2014, with co-author Alyn Shipton. He announced his decision to retire on 12 August 2019, after some 70 years of performing. The band continued under the musical direction of Bob Hunt. The line up of the Big Chris Barber Band in September 2019, which carried on with Barber's full support, was: Bob Hunt (trombone/arranger), Mike Henry and Gabriel Garrick (trumpets), Nick White, Trevor Whiting, and Ian Killoran (reeds), John Watson (drums), John Day (double bass), Joe Farler (banjo & guitar).

Barber was awarded an OBE in 1991 for services to music. In June 2006 he received an honorary doctorate from Durham University, and in September 2013 he was awarded the "Blues Louis" for his services to popularizing the blues in Europe at the "Lahnstein Blues Festival" (Germany), where he is honored with the annual award. In 2014, he was honored for his life's work with the German Jazz Trophy.

=== Long-term musical partnerships ===
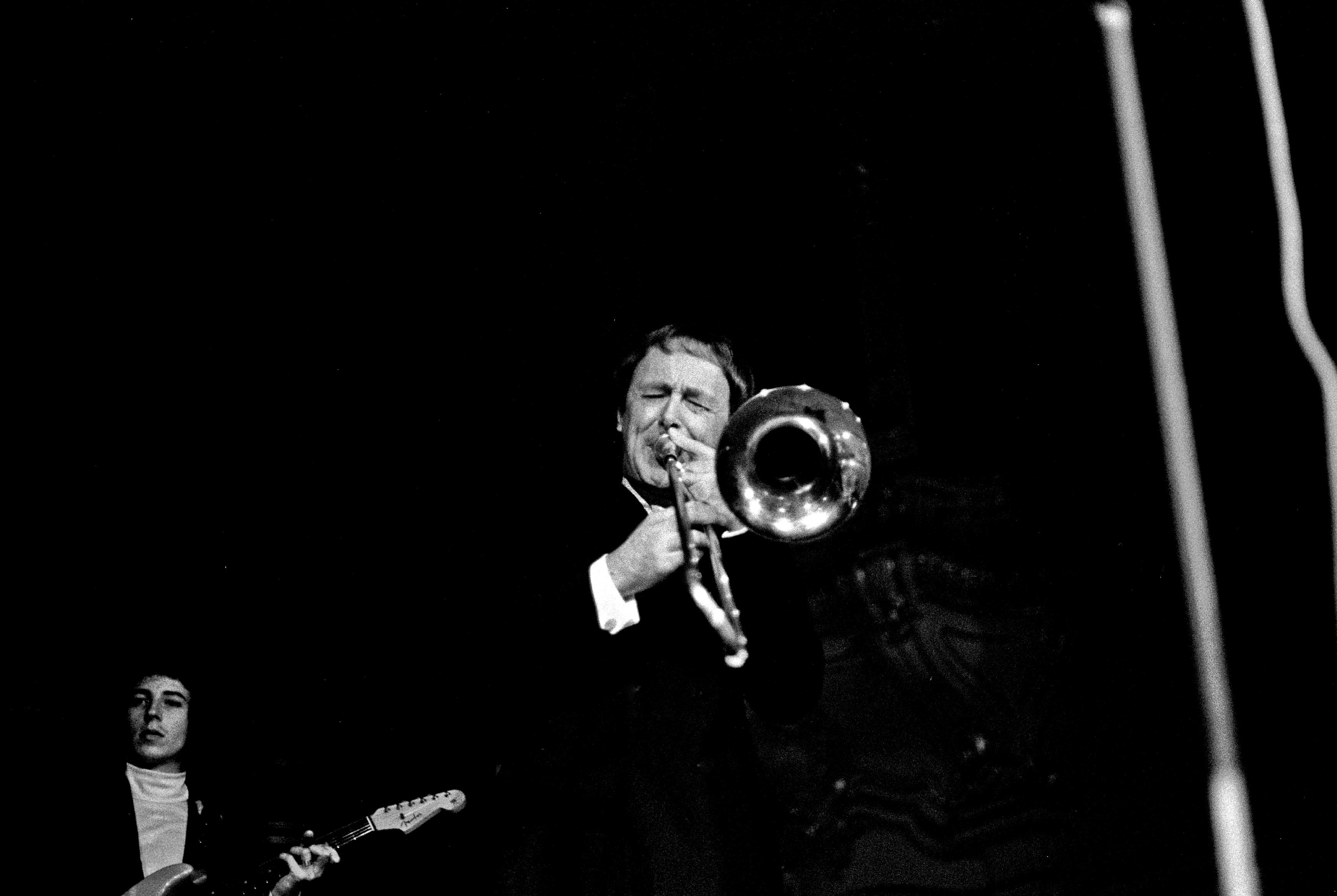
Chris Barber, 1972

Pat Halcox, trumpeter with the Chris Barber Band since 31 May 1954, retired after playing his last gig with the Big Chris Barber Band on 16 July 2008. Halcox and Barber were together in the band for 54 years – the longest continuous partnership in the history of jazz, exceeding even that of Duke Ellington and Harry Carney (48 years between 1926 and 1974). Tony Carter (reeds) also left the band at this time.

John Crocker (reeds) retired from the band in 2003 after a 30-year stint. Vic Pitt (double bass) retired in January 2007 after 30 years with the band. His feature duet with the drummers of the day, "Big Noise From Winnetka", was not only a feature of the Barber concerts, but also his time with the Kenny Ball band immediately before.

== Personal life ==
Barber was married four times: to dancer and singer Naida Lane; to the blues singer and band member Ottilie Patterson (from 1959 until their divorce in 1983); to Renate Hilbich, with whom he had two children; and finally to Kate Gray, who survived him.

Aside from his musical life, Barber was a motor racing enthusiast. His first race was at Brands Hatch in 1957, driving a Lotus Mark IX. He also owned several vintage Lagondas. His close friends included Lotus founder Colin Chapman and Ken Tyrrell.

He died on 2 March 2021, aged 90, having suffered from dementia.

== Select discography ==
- New Orleans Joys Chris Barber Jazz Band, with Lonnie Donegan Skiffle Group, 1954
- Bestsellers: Chris Barber & Papa Bue's Viking Jazzband, 1954
- Original Copenhagen Concert, (live) 1954
- Chris Barber in Concert, (live) 1956
- Chris Barber Plays, Vol. 1, 1955
- Chris Barber Plays, Vol. 2, 1956
- Chris Barber Plays, Vol. 3, 1957
- Chris Barber Plays, Vol. 4, 1957
- Chris Barber in Concert, Vol. 2, (live) 1958
- "Petite Fleur", 1958
- Chris Barber American Jazz band, 1960
- In Budapest, 1962
- Louis Jordan Sings, 1962
- Live in East Berlin, 1968
- Battersea Rain Dance, 1969
- Chris Barber & Lonnie Donegan, 1973
- Golden Hour of Chris Barber and his jazz Band featuring Vocals by Ottilie Patterson and Clarinet by Monty Sunshine , 1974
- Echoes of Ellington, Vol. 1, 1976
- Echoes of Ellington, Vol. 2, 1976
- Echoes of Ellington, 1978
- Take Me Back to New Orleans, 1980
- Concert for the BBC, 1982
- Copulatin' Jazz: The Music of Preservation Hall, 1993
- Live at the BP Studienhaus, 1997
- Cornbread, Peas & Black Molasses, (live) 1999
- The Big Chris Barber Band with Special Guest Andy Fairweather Low: As We Like It, 2009
- Chris Barber's Jazz Band, Chris Barber 1957–58, 2009
- The Chris Barber Jazz & Blues Band, Barbican Blues, 2009
- The Big Chris Barber Band, Barber At Blenheim, 2009
- Chris Barber's Jazz Band with Sonny Terry & Brownie McGhee, Sonny, Brownie & Chris, 2009
- Chris Barber Memories Of My Trip, 2011
- The Big Chris Barber Band 2011 European Tour
