= Ken Colyer =

English jazz trumpeter and cornetist (1928–1988)

Background information
- Born: 18 April 1928; Great Yarmouth, Norfolk, England
- Origin: London, England
- Died: 9 March 1988 (aged 59) France
- Genre: New Orleans jazz
- Occupation: Instrumentalist
- Instruments: Trumpet, cornet
- Years active: 1940s–1980s

Kenneth Colyer (18 April 1928 – 9 March 1988) was an English jazz trumpeter and cornetist, devoted to New Orleans jazz. His band was also known for skiffle interludes.

== Early life ==
He was born in Great Yarmouth, Norfolk, England, but grew up in Soho, London, and served as a member of his church choir. When his elder brother Bill (1922–2009) went off to serve in World War II he left his jazz records behind, which influenced Ken Colyer. He joined the Merchant Navy at 17, travelled around the world and heard famous jazz musicians in New Orleans, Louisiana.

== Career ==
In the UK, Colyer played with various bands and joined, in 1949, the Crane River Jazz Band (CRJB), with Ben Marshall, Sonny Morris, Pat Hawes, John R. T. Davies, Julian Davies, Ron Bowden and Monty Sunshine. The band played at the Royal Festival Hall on 14 July 1951 in the presence of Princess Elizabeth. Parts of that group merged with other musicians including Keith Christie and Ian Christie to form the Christie Brothers' Stompers. Colyer rejoined the Merchant Navy, jumped ship in Mobile, Alabama, and travelled to New Orleans, where he played with his idols in George Lewis' band. He was offered the job of lead trumpeter on a tour, but was caught by the authorities, detained and deported.

Colyer was invited to take the trumpet lead for the Chris Barber Band and so formed the first line-up of Ken Colyer's Jazzmen: Chris Barber, Monty Sunshine, Ron Bowden (born Ronald Arthur Bowden, 22 February 1928, Fulham, London), Lonnie Donegan and Jim Bray (born James Michael Bray, 24 April 1927, Richmond, Surrey). They made their first recordings on Storyville in 1953. Colyer and the others parted company in 1954, each claiming in later years to have fired the other. The next, brief, band in the mid-1950s featured Bernard "Acker" Bilk on clarinet and Ed O'Donnell on trombone.

Then followed Colyer's band with what is seen today as its classic line-up: Mac Duncan (trombone), Ian Wheeler (clarinet), Johnny Bastable (banjo), Ron Ward (bass) and Colin Bowden (drums), later joined by Ray Foxley (piano). This band played together until the early 1960s when the new front-line featured, at various times, Sammy Rimington and Tony Pyke (clarinet), Graham Stewart and Geoff Cole (trombone), Bill Cole (bass) and Malc Murphy (drums). In January 1959, the British music magazine NME reported that the biggest trad jazz event to be staged in Britain had taken place at Alexandra Palace. The event included George Melly, Diz Disley, Acker Bilk, Chris Barber, Kenny Ball, Alex Welsh, Monty Sunshine, Bob Wallis, Bruce Turner, Mick Mulligan and Colyer. In 1963, the Colyer band starred under their own name in the film West 11.

In 1972, after a bout with stomach cancer, Colyer took his doctors' advice to stop leading a band. The band continued to work under the leadership of banjoist Johnny Bastable, as his "Chosen Six", recruiting John Shillito (trumpet). Colyer continued with a solo career into the 1980s. Around that time he was occasionally associated with Chris Blount's New Orleans Jazz Band, and some of his live recordings with that band were later released on a CD (KCTCD5). He moved to the south of France in his last years. Lake Records was started by re-issuing Colyer albums (from the Decca catalogue) and the current catalogue contains most of his best recordings.

== Death ==
Colyer latterly lived in the French village of Les Issambres. He died on 9 March 1988, aged 59.

== Legacy ==
A biography, Goin' Home (published 2010), was compiled by Mike Pointon and Ray Smith. It won an accolade from the House of Commons Jazz Society in May 2011. A year after Colyer's death, a group of family members, friends and musicians met at the London School of Economics to set up the Ken Colyer Trust with the original aim of publishing his autobiography When Dreams are in the Dust. For 25 years it supported the work of established jazz musicians and encouraged young musicians and audiences. That work is now being continued by other interested parties. The trust sponsored a memorial plaque at the site of the jazz club Studio 51, at 11–12 Great Newport Street, near Leicester Square. It was unveiled on 18 April 1995 by Humphrey Lyttelton, Julian Davies and Ken Clarke.

== Discography ==
=== Singles ===
Ken Colyer's Jazzmen

- Decca F10241 "Goin' Home" / "Isle of Capri" (1954)
- Decca F10332 "La Harpe Street Blues" / "Too Busy" (1954)
- Decca F10504 "Early Hours" / "Cataract Rag" (1955)
- Decca F10519 "If I Ever Cease to Love You" / "The Entertainer" (1955)
- Decca F10565 "It Looks Like a Big Time Tonight" / "Red Wing" (1955)
- Decca FJ10755 "All the Girls Go Crazy About the Way I Walk" / "Dippermouth Blues" (1956)
- Tempo A117 "Just a Closer Walk with Thee" / "Sheik of Araby" (1956)
- Tempo A120 "If I Ever Cease to Love" / "Isle of Capri" (1956)
- Tempo A126 "My Bucket's Got a Hole in It" / "Wabash Blues" (1956)
- Tempo A136 "Maryland, My Maryland" / "The World is Waiting for the Sunrise" (1956)
- Columbia DB4676 "The Happy Wanderer" / "Maryland, My Maryland" (1961)
- Columbia DB4783 "Postman's Lament" / "Too Busy" (1962)

=== EPs ===
- Ken Colyer in New Orleans, (Vogue, 1953)
- Ken Colyer's Jazzmen (Tempo, 1953)
- They All Played Ragtime (Decca, 1958)
- And Back to New Orleans (Decca)

=== Albums ===
- Decca Skiffle Sessions, Lake
- The Lost 1954 Royal Festival Hall Tapes, (Upbeat Jazz, 2004)
- More Lost 1954 Royal Festival Hall Tapes, (Upbeat Jazz, 2008)
- Live at York Arts Centre (Upbeat, 1972)
- The Crane River Jazz Band
- Club Session with Colyer (Decca, 1956)
- Studio 51 Club Sessions with Colyer (Upbeat, 1972)
- Out of Nowhere (KC, 1965)
- Back to the Delta (Decca, 1954)
- New Orleans to London (Lake, 1953)
- Marching to New Orleans (Decca, 1957)
- Marching Back to New Orleans (Lake, 1955/57)
- This is Jazz (Columbia, 1959)
- Sensation – The Decca Years (Lake, 1955–59)
- The Classic Years 1957) Upbeat
