= Freddy Randall =

English musician (1921–1999)

- Born: Frederick James Randall; 6 May 1921; Clapton, East London, England
- Died: 18 May 1999 (aged 78) Teignmouth, Devon, England
- Genres: Jazz
- Occupations: Trumpeter, bandleader
- Instrument: Trumpet
- Label: Black Lion

Frederick James 'Freddy' Randall (6 May 1921 – 18 May 1999) was an English jazz trumpeter and bandleader born in Clapton, East London.

== Biography ==
Born in Clapton, East London at the age of just 18 Randall led the St. Louis Four in 1939, and played as a freelance sideman in the early 1940s. He served in the military during World War II, then played with Freddy Mirfield's group featuring Johnny Dankworth called the 'Garbage Men'.

After the mid-1940s he led his own Dixieland jazz groups which featured many well-known English trad jazz stars of the era. He quit music between 1958 and 1963 due to lung problems. In the mid-1960s he began recording again, frequently teaming up with clarinet player Dave Shepherd and recording for Black Lion Records in 1972–73. He played with Americans such as Sidney Bechet, Bud Freeman, Wild Bill Davison, Pee Wee Russell, Bill Coleman, and Teddy Wilson. Randall was considered one of the UK's top mainstream trumpeters.

He died aged 78 on 18 May 1999 in Teignmouth, Devon.
