= Acker Bilk =

English clarinetist and vocalist (1929–2014)

Acker Bilk MBE
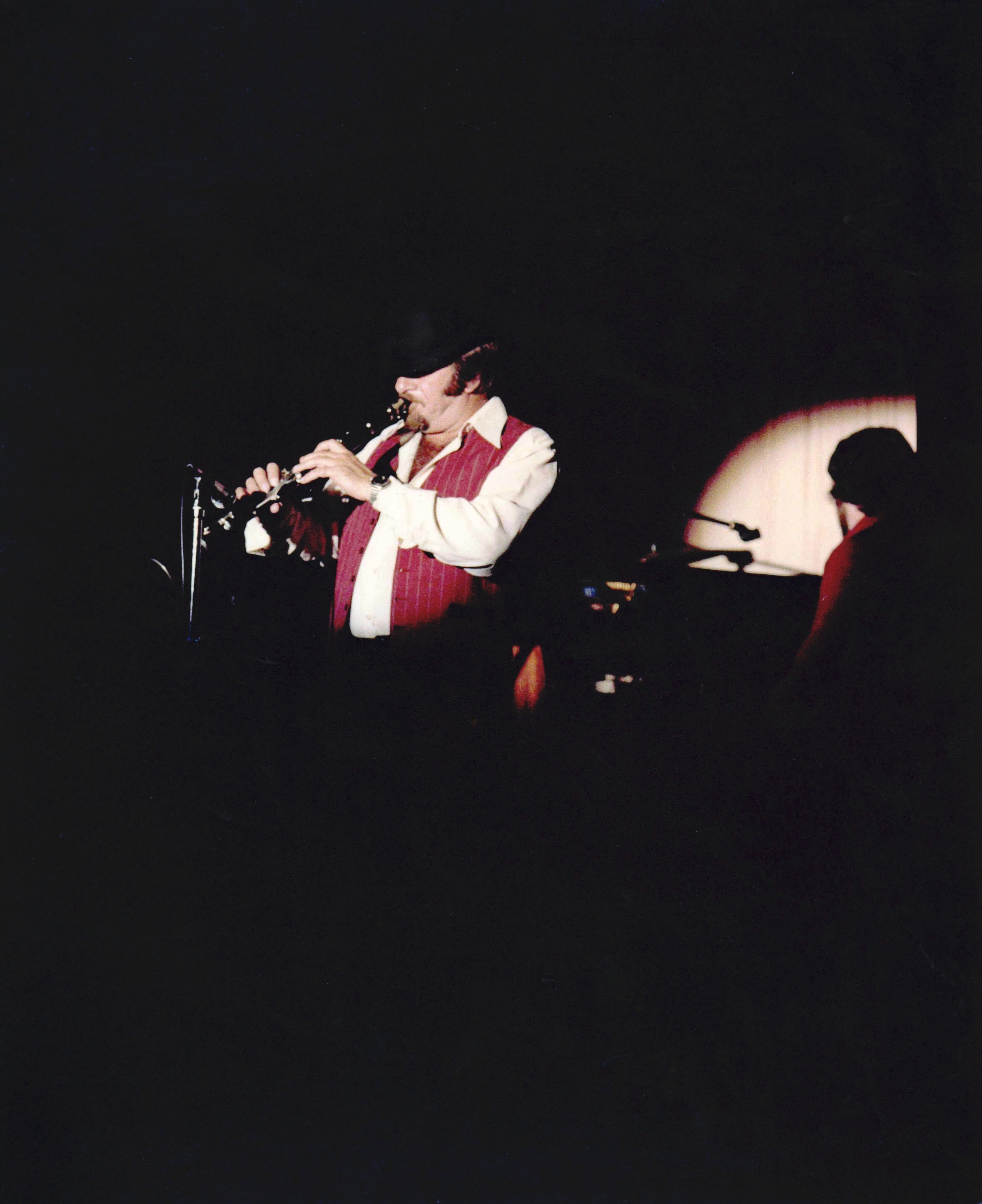
- Bilk performing live in the 1960s.
- Born: Bernard Stanley Bilk; 28 January 1929; Pensford, Somerset, England
- Died: 2 November 2014 (aged 85); Bath, Somerset, England
- Occupation: Musician
- Years active: 1954–2013
- Spouse: Jean Hawkins (m. 1954)
- Children: 2
- Musical career
- Genres: Trad jazz, Easy listening
- Instrument: Clarinet
- Labels: Atco; EMI; Columbia; Castle; Philips; Stomp Off; GNP; Lake

Bernard Stanley "Acker" Bilk (28 January 1929 – 2 November 2014) was an English clarinetist and vocalist known for his breathy, vibrato-rich, lower-register style, and distinctive appearance – of goatee, bowler hat and striped waistcoat.

Bilk's 1961 instrumental tune "Stranger on the Shore" became the UK's biggest selling single of 1962, spending 55 weeks on the charts and reaching No. 1 in the NME singles chart and No. 2 in the Record Retailer chart. In May 1962, it reached No. 1 on the weekly Billboard Hot 100 singles chart, and also took the No. 1 spot on the Year-End Hot 100 singles – becoming the first ever British artist to reach either of these Hot 100 achievements. (Note: In 1952, before the creation of the Hot 100, Billboard had four complimentary charts in use. That year, with the song "Auf Wiederseh'n, Sweetheart", Vera Lynn (accompanied by the Soldiers and Airmen of Her Majesty's Forces and the Johnny Johnston Singers) reached No. 1 on all four charts.) In Canada it was number 4 for 4 weeks before peaking at number 3.

== Early life ==
Bilk was born in Pensford, Somerset, in 1929. He earned the nickname "Acker" from the Somerset slang for "friend" or "mate". His parents tried to teach him the piano but, as a boy, Bilk found it restricted his love of outdoor activities, including football. He lost two front teeth in a school fight and half a finger in a sledging accident, both of which he said affected his eventual clarinet style.

On leaving school Bilk joined the workforce of W.D. & H.O. Wills's cigarette factory in Bristol; he stayed there for three years, putting tobacco in the cooling room and then pushing tobacco through a blower. He then undertook three years of National Service with the Royal Engineers in the Suez Canal Zone. He learned the clarinet there after his sapper friend, John A. Britten, gave him one bought at a bazaar and for which Britten had no use. The clarinet had no reed, so Britten fashioned a makeshift one for the instrument from scrap wood. Bilk later borrowed a better instrument from the army and kept it after demobilisation. After National Service, Bilk joined his uncle's blacksmith business and qualified in the trade.

== Career ==
Bilk played with friends on the Bristol jazz circuit and in 1951 moved to London to play with Ken Colyer's band. Bilk disliked London, so returned west and formed his own band in Pensford called the Chew Valley Jazzmen, which was renamed the Bristol Paramount Jazz Band when they moved to London in 1951. Their agent then booked them for a six-week gig in Düsseldorf, Germany, playing in a beer bar seven hours a night, seven nights a week. During this time, Bilk and the band developed their distinctive style and appearance, complete with striped waistcoats and bowler hats.

After returning from Germany, Bilk was based in Plaistow, London, and his band played in London jazz clubs. It was from here that Bilk became part of the boom in trad jazz in the United Kingdom in the late 1950s. In 1960, their single "Summer Set" (a pun on their home county), co-written by Bilk and pianist Dave Collett, reached number five on the UK singles chart, and began a run of 11 chart hit singles. ("Summer Set" was also used prominently in Daniel Farson's controversial 1960 television documentary Living for Kicks, a portrait of British teenage life at the time). In 1961 "Acker Bilk and His Paramount Jazz Band" appeared at the Royal Variety Performance.

Bilk did not become an internationally known musician until 1962, when the experimental use of a string ensemble on one of his albums and the inclusion of a composition of his own as its keynote piece won him an audience outside the UK. He had composed a melody, entitled "Jenny" after his daughter, but was asked to change the title to "Stranger on the Shore" for use in a British television series of the same name. He went on to record it as the title track of a new album in which his deep and quavering clarinet was backed by the Leon Young String Chorale.

The single was not only a big hit in the United Kingdom, where it stayed on the charts for 55 weeks, helped by Bilk being the subject of the TV show This Is Your Life, but also topped the American charts. As a result, Bilk was the second British artist to have a single in the number-one position on the Billboard Hot 100 singles chart. "Stranger on the Shore" sold over one million copies, and was awarded a gold disc. At the height of his career, Bilk's public relations workers were known as the "Bilk Marketing Board", a pun on the Milk Marketing Board.

At the height of his international fame in 1962, he appeared in two theatrical motion pictures. It's Trad, Dad! (released in the United States by Columbia Pictures as Ring-a-Ding Rhythm) was a Richard Lester musical combining dixieland and rock-and-roll specialties; "Mr. Acker Bilk" and his band were the best represented, with three songs and a speaking role for Bilk. The second picture, Band of Thieves, was a comedy starring "Mr. Acker Bilk" and his group as musicians in prison. His music was also heard on the soundtracks to films such as Bitter Harvest (1963), West 11 (1963), and the musical comedy It's All Over Town (1964). He also played a cameo role in the latter film.

Bilk's success tapered off when British rock and roll made its big international impact beginning in 1964 and he shifted direction to the cabaret circuit. However, he did record a series of well-regarded albums in the mid-1960s. Three of them, including the 1965 collaboration Together, with the Danish jazz pianist and composer Bent Fabric ("Alley Cat"), were also released successfully in the United States on the Atlantic Records subsidiary Atco. In 1968 the album Blue Acker, produced by Denis Preston and with arrangements by Stan Tracey, illustrated that Bilk remained highly regarded as a musician, even by those (like Tracey) on the "modern jazz" side of things. Duncan Heining rates it as "one of the highlights of British jazz of the period".

Bilk finally had another chart success in 1976 with "Aria", which went to number five in the United Kingdom. In May 1977 Bilk and his Paramount Jazz Band provided the interval act for the Eurovision Song Contest. His last chart appearance was in 1978, when the TV-promoted album released on Pye/Warwick, Evergreen, reached 17 in a 14-week album chart run. In the early 1980s, Bilk and his signature hit were newly familiar, due to "Stranger on the Shore" being used in the soundtrack to Sweet Dreams, the film biography of country music singer Patsy Cline. "Aria" featured as a central musical motif in the 2012 Polish film Mój rower.

Bilk continued to tour with his Paramount Jazz Band, as well as performing concerts with his two contemporaries, Chris Barber and Kenny Ball, both of whom were born in 1930, as "The 3Bs". Bilk also provided vocals on many of his tracks, including on "I'm an Old Cowhand", "The Folks Who Live on the Hill", "White Cliffs of Dover", "Travellin On" and "That's My Home".

He was appointed MBE in 2001 and in 2005 he was awarded the BBC Jazz Awards' "Gold Award". One of his recordings was with the Chris Barber band, sharing the clarinet spot with the band's regular reedsmen, John Crocker and Ian Wheeler. Bilk made a CD with Wally Fawkes for the Lake label in 2002. He appeared on three albums by Van Morrison: Down the Road; What's Wrong With This Picture?; and Born to Sing: No Plan B. In 2012 Bilk said that, after 50 years, he was "fed up" with playing his most famous tune, "Stranger on the Shore".

== Personal life ==
In 1954 Bilk married his childhood sweetheart, Jean Hawkins, whom he met in the same class at school. The couple had two children, Jenny and Pete. After living near London in Potters Bar for many years, the couple retired to Pensford in Somerset.

In 1997, Bilk was diagnosed with throat cancer, which was treated through surgery and then followed by daily radiation therapy at Bristol Haematology and Oncology Centre. Subsequently, he had eight keyhole operations for bladder cancer and suffered a minor stroke.

Bilk died in Bath, Somerset, on 2 November 2014, at the age of 85. He was survived by his wife and two children. Bilk's last recorded interview was for Cornish community station Penwith Radio (now Coast FM) and was broadcast posthumously on Sunday 16 November 2014 at 9:00 pm.

== Other interests ==
Bilk was part of a consortium which took over the Oxford Cheetahs speedway team in 1972. They were rebranded as Oxford Rebels as part of the takeover.

== Legacy ==
Bilk has been described as the "Great Master of the Clarinet". "Stranger on the Shore" – which he was once quoted as calling "my old-age pension" – remains a standard of jazz and popular music alike.

== Discography ==
=== Albums ===
Released	Album	Peak chart positions		Label
Released	Album	UK Charts	US Charts	Label
1960	The Seven Ages of Acker	6	–	Columbia
1960	Omnibus	14	–	Pye
1961	Acker	17	–	Columbia
1961	Golden Treasury of Bilk	11	–	Columbia
1961	The Best of Barber and Bilk (with Chris Barber)	4	–	Pye
1961	The Best of Barber and Bilk Volume 2 (with Chris Barber)	8	–	Pye
1962	Stranger on the Shore	6	3	Columbia
1962	Above the Stars	–	48	Atco
1962	The Best of Ball, Barber and Bilk (with Kenny Ball and Chris Barber)	1	–	Pye
1963	A Taste of Honey	17	–	Columbia
1965	Together (with Bent Fabric)	17	–	Atco
1966	Mood For Love	–	–	Atco
1966	Mr Acker Bilk in Paris (with the Leon Young String Chorale)	–	–	Atco
1967	London Is My Cup of Tea	–	–	Atco
1968	Blue Acker	–	–	Columbia, Lake LACD218
1976	The One For Me	38	–	Pye
1977	Sheer Magic	5	–	Warwick
1978	Evergreen	17	–	Warwick

=== EPs ===
Released	EP	Peak chart positions	Label
Released	EP	UK Charts	Label
1958	Mr. Acker Bilk Marches On	—	Pye
1959	Mister Acker Bilk Sings	—	Pye
1959	Master Acker Bilk	—	Esquire
1959	Mister Acker Bilk and His Paramount Jazz Band Volume 1	—	Melodisc
1959	Mr. Acker Bilk Requests – Part 1	—	Pye
1959	Acker's Away	—	Columbia
1959	Mr. Acker Bilk Requests – Part 2	—	Pye
1960	Mister Acker Bilk and His Paramount Jazz Band Volume 2	50	Melodisc
1960	Mister Acker Bilk and His Paramount Jazz Band Volume 3	—	Melodisc
1960	Mister Acker Bilk and His Paramount Jazz Band Volume 4	—	Melodisc
1960	The Seven Ages of Acker	—	Columbia
1960	The Seven Ages of Acker Volume 2	—	Columbia
1960	Clarinet Jamboree Part 1	—	Columbia
1961	Acker Volume 1	—	Columbia
1961	Acker Volume 2	—	Columbia
1962	A Golden Treasury of Bilk 1	—	Columbia
1962	Four Hits and a Mister	—	Columbia
1962	A Golden Treasury of Bilk Volume 2	—	Columbia
1962	Band of Thieves	—	Columbia
1962	Mr. Acker Bilk's Lansdowne Folio – Volume 1	—	Columbia
1963	Bilk and Bossa	—	Columbia
1963	Four More Hits and a Mister	—	Columbia
1963	Manana	—	Columbia
1964	Snag It	—	Arc
1965	Franklin Street Blues	—	Arc

=== Singles ===
Released	Single	Peak chart positions		Label
Released	Single	UK	US	Label
1956	"Dippermouth Blues"	—	—	Tempo
1960	"Summer Set"	5	104	Columbia
1960	"Marching Through Georgia"	—	—	Pye
1960	"White Cliffs of Dover"	30	—	Columbia
1960	"C.R.E. March"	—	—	Pye
1960	"Blaze Away!"	—	—	Pye
1960	"Under the Double Eagle"	—	—	Pye
1960	"El Abanico"	—	—	Pye
1960	"Dardanella"	—	105	Pye
1960	"Gladiolus Rag"	—	—	Pye
1960	"Buona Sera"	7	—	Columbia/Atco
1961	"Sweet Elizabeth"	—	—	Columbia/Atco
1961	"That's My Home"	7	—	Columbia/Atco
1961	"The Stars and Stripes Forever"	22	—	Columbia/Atco
1961	"Stranger on the Shore"	2	1	Columbia/Atco
1962	"Frankie and Johnny"	42	—	Columbia/Atco
1962	"Gotta See Baby Tonight"	24	—	Columbia/Atco
1962	"Above the Stars"	–	59	Columbia/Atco
1962	"Lonely"	14	—	Columbia/Atco
1962	"Limelight"	—	92	Columbia/Atco
1963	"A Taste of Honey"	16	—	Columbia/Atco
1963	"Only You (And You Alone)"	—	77	Columbia/Atco
1963	"Manana Pasado Manana"	—	—	Columbia/Atco
1963	"Moonlight Tango"	—	—	Columbia/Atco
1963	"The Harem"	—	125	Columbia/Atco
1964	"Bustamento"	—	—	Columbia/Atco
1964	"Dream Ska"	—	—	Columbia/Atco
1965	"Mona Lisa"	—	—	Columbia/Atco
1966	"Petite Fleur"	—	—	Columbia/Atco
1966	"La Playa"	—	—	Columbia/Atco
1967	"The Girl with the Sun in Her Hair"	—	—	Columbia/Atco
1969	"When I'm Away"	—	—	
1970	"Thomas O'Malley Cat"	—	—	
1971	"Irish Lullaby"	—	—	
1972	"Burgundy Street"	—	—	Pye
1974	"When I See You Smile Again"	—	—	Pye
1975	"Canios Tune"	—	—	Pye
1976	"Homecoming"	—	—	Pye
1976	"Good Morning"	—	—	Pye
1976	"Aria"	5	—	Pye
1976	"Incontro"	—	—	Pye
1977	"Love Theme"	—	—	Pye
1977	"Dancing in the Dark"	—	—	Pye
1978	"Universe"	—	—	Pye
1978	"Mister Men Theme"	—	—	Pye
1978	"Theme from The Incredible Hulk"	—	—	Pye
1979	"Aranjuez Mon Amour"	—	—	Pye
1980	"Song for Guy"	—	—	Piccadilly
1980	"I Like Beer" (with Max Bygraves)	—	—	Piccadilly
1980	"You Say Something Nice About Everybody"	—	—	Piccadilly
1980	"Verde"	—	—	Piccadilly
1980	"On Sunday"	—	—	Piccadilly
1981	"Find a Way"	—	—	PRT

== See also ==
- West Country dialects
- Django Reinhardt, another influential jazz musician with finger-damage who was still able to become a virtuoso on his instrument
