= Trad jazz =

Form of jazz in the United States and Britain in the 1930s, 1940s, 1950s and 1960s

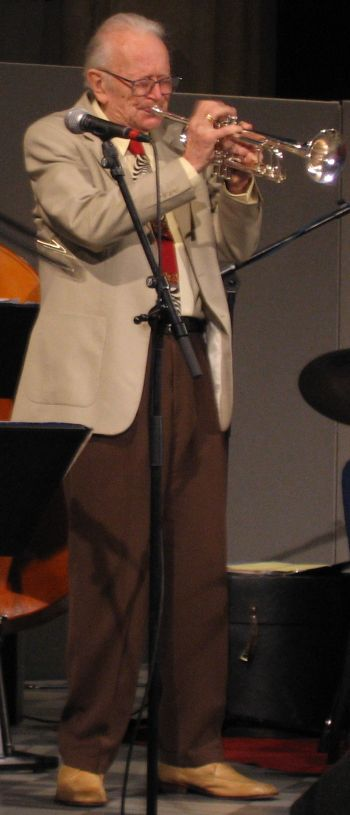
- Humphrey Lyttelton, an advocate for the trad jazz revival
- Typical instruments: Trumpets; trombones * clarinets * flutes * banjos * double basses * drums * electric guitars * pipe organs * saxophones * electric basses * pianos * electric organs

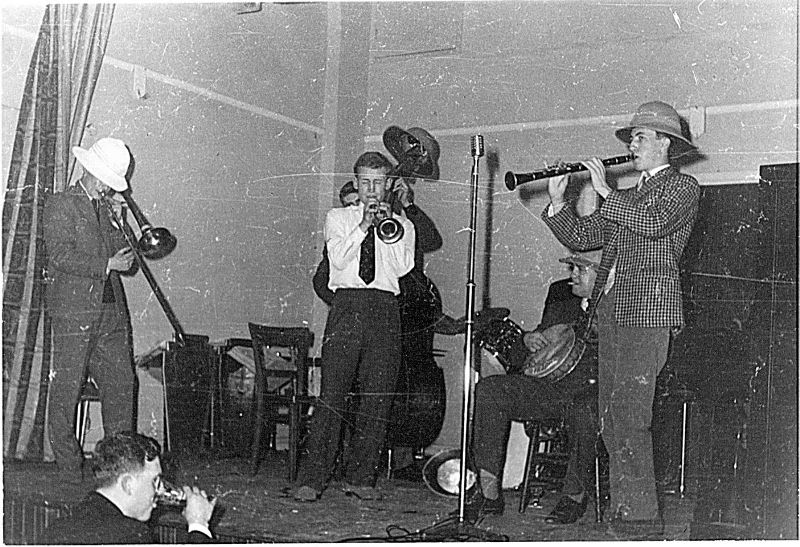
London's Tranquil Valley Stompers, 1961.

Trad jazz, short for "traditional jazz", is a form of jazz in the United States and Britain that flourished from the 1930s to 1960s, based on the earlier New Orleans Dixieland jazz style. Prominent English trad jazz musicians such as Chris Barber, Freddy Randall, Acker Bilk, Kenny Ball, Ken Colyer and Monty Sunshine performed a populist repertoire that also included jazz versions of pop songs and nursery rhymes.

== Beginnings of revival ==
A Dixieland revival began in the United States on the West Coast in the late 1930s as a backlash to the Chicago style, which was close to swing. Lu Watters and the Yerba Buena Jazz Band, and trombonist Turk Murphy, adopted the repertoire of Joe "King" Oliver, Jelly Roll Morton, Louis Armstrong and W. C. Handy: bands included banjo and tuba in the rhythm sections. A New Orleans–based traditional revival began with the later recordings of Jelly-Roll Morton and the rediscovery of Bunk Johnson in 1942. This revival ultimately led to the founding of Preservation Hall in the French Quarter of New Orleans during the 1960s.

Early King Oliver pieces exemplify this style of hot jazz; however, as individual performers began stepping to the front as soloists, a new form of music emerged. One of the ensemble players in King Oliver's Creole Jazz Band, Louis Armstrong, was by far the most influential of the soloists, creating, in his wake, a demand for this "new" style of jazz, in the late 1920s and early 1930s. Other influential stylists who are still revered in traditional jazz circles today include Sidney Bechet, Bix Beiderbecke, Wingy Manone and Muggsy Spanier. Many artists of the big band era, including Glenn Miller, Gene Krupa and Benny Goodman, had their beginnings in trad jazz.

== Britain ==
In Britain, where boogie-woogie, "stride" piano and jump blues were popular in the 1940s, George Webb's Dixielanders pioneered a trad revival during the Second World War, and Ken Colyer's Crane River band added and maintained a strong thread of New Orleans purism. Humphrey Lyttelton, who played with Webb, formed his own band based on the New Orleans/Louis Armstrong tradition in 1948 but, without losing the Armstrong influence, gradually adopted a more mainstream approach. By 1958 his band included three saxophones. During the 1950s and well into the 1960s the "Three B's" Chris Barber, Acker Bilk, and Kenny Ball were particularly successful, all making hit records. Other successful bands including Terry Lightfoot, George Chisholm, Monty Sunshine, Mick Mulligan, with George Melly, and Mike Cotton – who "went R'n'B" in 1963–1964 – made regular appearances live, on the air and occasionally in the British charts, as did Louis Armstrong himself. More light-hearted versions were offered by the Bonzo Dog Doo-Dah Band, the Temperance Seven and the New Vaudeville Band. Dixieland stylings can be found here and there on records by the Rolling Stones, the Beatles, the Small Faces and the Kinks, while the Who actually performed trad jazz in their early days.

In the 1950s a number of provincial amateur bands had strong local followings and occasionally appeared together at "Jazz Jamborees". These bands included the Merseysippi Jazz Band, still active, which toured overseas, Second City Jazzband (Birmingham), Steel City Stompers (Sheffield), Clyde Valley Stompers (Glasgow), the Tranquil Valley Stompers (London) and the Saints Jazzband (Manchester).

Chris Barber gave a stage to Lonnie Donegan and Alexis Korner, setting off the craze for skiffle and then British rhythm and blues that powered the beat boom of the 1960s
