= Dick Charlesworth =

English musician (1932–2008)

- Born: 8 January 1932; Sheffield, England
- Died: 15 April 2008 (aged 76)
- Occupation: Musician

Richard Anthony Charlesworth (8 January 1932 – 15 April 2008) was an English jazz clarinettist, saxophonist and bandleader.

== Biography ==
Charlesworth was born and brought up in Sheffield and attended King Edward VII School. At 16, he became a clerk in the Ministry of Labour and was in due course transferred to London. He bought a clarinet and started playing jazz as a hobby in 1952-53. He was entirely self-taught, but became good enough to play clarinet and saxophone in a dance band and perform with jazz bands in south London including Jim Weller’s Jazzmen. He formed his first group in 1956 while still doing his day job, and his 'Dick Charlesworth's Jazzmen' won the South London Jazz Band Championship in 1957. Charlesworth's group was signed by the Melodisc label, and they recorded an EP in December 1957 and produced an album for Doug Dobell's 77 Records.

Charlesworth left the civil service in 1959 and became a professional musician. He signed a recording contract with EMI and his group was remarketed as 'Dick Charlesworth's City Gents'. This was the time when light jazz was popular in the British charts as typified by Acker Bilk and Kenny Ball, also attired in distinctive costumes. Charlesworth's group sported pin stripes and bowler hats, and had a Latin motto, Dum vivimus vivamus, (“While we live, let us enjoy life”). Their only chart single was "Billy Boy", which reached 43 in the UK Singles Chart in May 1961. The City Gents often appeared on television including The Morecambe and Wise Show and Sunday Night at the London Palladium. Charlesworth sang the title song of a comedy film, In the Doghouse, starring Leslie Phillips and featured in his own 15 minute musical short in 1963.

However the British pop scene changed significantly in the early sixties and jazz went out of vogue. Charlesworth broke up his band, and from 1964 to 1969 worked for P&O fronting a band on the cruise liners Canberra and Orsova. He then settled in Mojacar, in Spain where he ran a music bar until he returned to Britain in 1977. He was active on the London jazz scene until the early 2000s. He worked with many artists including Keith Smith, Rod Mason, Alan Littlejohn and Denny Wright. He appeared on the BBC Radio series, Jazz Score, a quiz show which encouraged its participants to relate anecdotes about their lives in jazz.

In his later years, Charlesworth lived in Thames Ditton, Surrey, and played a residency at the George and Dragon pub every Tuesday with his band "The Dick Charlesworth's Fraternity Four", and also at various other local pubs. The Dick Charleworth's Fraternity Four included Alan Dandy (piano), John Rodber (bass guitar) and Don Cook (drums) and they released their final recording in August 2004.

Charlesworth died following a heart attack in April 2008, at the age of 76.
