= Ian Hunter-Randall =

English trad jazz trumpeter

Ian Hunter-Randall (3 January 1938 – 13 February 1999) was an English trad jazz trumpeter born in London.

Hunter-Randall played locally in Dixieland-style jazz ensembles starting in the late 1950s. He worked with Monty Sunshine for several years in the mid-1960s, and also briefly with Acker Bilk, but is best known as a sideman for Terry Lightfoot, with whom he worked from 1967 to 1994. He also worked with Pete Allen from 1978 to 1981. In the 1990s he led his own ensemble and also played with Good Time Jazz, Laurie Chescoe's band.
