= St Matthew's Baths =

Coordinates: 52°03′35″N 1°08′50″E

- Interactive map of St Matthew's Baths
- Location: 4 Civic Dr, Ipswich, Suffolk, IP1 2AX
- Dimensions: Length: 75ft (22.9m); Width: 30 ft (9.1m)

Construction
- Opened: 1924
- Construction cost: £22,770

St Matthew's Baths was a swimming venue in Ipswich that opened in 1924 and closed in 1984 and a music venue.

== Design, construction and funding ==
The original brick building cost around £22,770 when it opened in 1924.The pool consisted of a 75x30 ft (22.9x9.1m) 6-lane. It had a balcony for 200 spectators and 21 slipper baths, which were useful for a time when many houses had no bathrooms. The pool was used for recreational swimming, swimming lessons, as a music venue, competitions and even the annual Ipswich Police swimming gala. The pool closed for use in 1984.

The building is currently hidden behind a Tesco store.

== Baths Hall - Music venue and other events ==
During the winter months a sprung maple floor, which was known to bounce, would cover the pool for concerts and other events It was in heavy demand after the local Public Hall burned down in 1947.

In the winter months in late 1958, promoters Nanda and Ron Lesley ran the very successful Ipswich Jazz Club, called Ipswich Bluesville, held on a Monday evening. During this tenure, Ipswich Bluesville hosted the TV show Ready Steady Go.

During the late 1960s up to 1975, notable jazz musicians and rock legends played Bath Halls. Live acts included -

- Eric Clapton with Cream,
- Rod Stewart
- The Move
- The Who
- Deep Purple
- Jimmy James and the Vagabonds
- John Mayall & the Bluesbreakers
- Sweet
- Camel
- Focus
- Status Quo
- Brian Auger
- John Baldry
- Graham Bond
- Chicken Shack
- Keith Emerson
- Fleetwood Mac
- Jethro Tull
- Zoot Money
- Spencer Davies
- Steampacket
- The Equals
- The Herd
- Traffic
- Kenny Ball
- Chris Barber
- Acker Bilk
- Mike Cotton
- Ken Colyer
- Mike Daniels and the Delta Jazz Band
- Alan Elsden
- Terry Lightfoot
- Humphrey Lyttelton
- Bob Wallis

Led Zeppelin. Led Zeppelin opened the night with Immigrant Song and gig went on to be named "Suffolk's greatest gig" and a poster for the gig taken off the wall that night sold for £2000 in 2014.

During the 1960s and 70s, events also ranged from boxing, wrestling, a model engineering exhibition to a table tennis club, keep fit sessions, a hairdressing competitions, the WI AGM, youth club, skiffle group competition, and the News of the World Darts Tournament.

== Closure ==
In the 1970s the Ipswich Corn Exchange became the entertainment centre, so all year round swimming took place at St Matthew's until it was sold to developers after the opening the new Crown Pools in 1984.

== Recent developments ==
The Bath Hall's original pool was permanently covered and a first floor created. It re-opened as The Gym Ipswich on the upper level but closed in 2020, due to COVID19 restrictions.

In 2021, the Baths Hall was opened again and the ground floor was turned into a new music venue for Ipswich, named The Baths. It brings music back to the venue full circle and has hosted Pigsx7, The Orielles, Field Music, This Is The Kit, Porridge Radio, and The Orb.

The original arches and ceiling windows can still be viewed on the upper floor.
