= Antolini =

Antolini is a surname. Notable people with the surname include:

- Charly Antolini (born 1937), Swiss jazz drummer
- Giovanni Antonio Antolini (1756–1841), Italian architect and writer
- Tina Antolini, Peabody-Award-winning radio producer

See also

- Charly Antolini Meets Dick Morrissey, is the second album recorded by Swiss drummer Charly Antolini and UK tenor sax player Dick Morrissey
