= Johnny Van Derrick =

British jazz violinist (1926–1995)

Van Derrick, Johnny
- Born: 11 August 1926; Ealing
- Died: 15 May 1995 (aged 69); Denham, Buckinghamshire
- Other names: Van Derrick, John Arthur
- Occupation: Jazz violinist

John Arthur "Johnny" Van Derrick (11 August 1926, Ealing – 15 May 1995, Denham, Buckinghamshire) was a British jazz violinist, who also worked as session musician in pop music.

== Life and work ==
Van Derrick was introduced to music by his father, a Dutch cornet player. He attended the conservatory in Brussels, and until the outbreak of the Second World War he received a classical musical training. In London during the war he played trumpet in dance bands, initially Louis Mexano's Accordion Band, before joining the merchant navy. In the post-war years he played trumpet in the dance bands of Maurice Winnick and Lou Preager. Subsequently, he took violin lessons with his mentor Sascha Lasserson and played in the Halle Orchestra, before setting up as a freelance musician. He appeared with Roy Fox and Geraldo, and in the early 1960s played in the Diz Disley String Quintet, with which he made his first recording (At the Jazz Band Ball), as well as with Tubby Hayes, Gary Potter and the Jack Toogood Swingtet. In 1976, after serious illness, he was able to start working again.

Through the 1980s Van Derrick often played with Denny Wright. In 1983-4 he toured with Biréli Lagrène. He later appeared with Fapy Lafertin, Hebe and The Mayfair Merrymakers (as well as with Digby Fairweather, Keith Nichols), Diz Disley and The Soho String Quintette (Van Derrick is the violinist in this TV performance of Sweet Georgia Brown), Howard Alden and Tony Crombie & Friends.

In 1992 Van Derrick recorded the album Always On the Fiddle in Jersey with Marvin Hanglider (piano), Phil Bond (guitar) and Pete Townsend (bass); in 1993 followed the duo album Gershwinning (with Phil Bond), on which he gave interpretations of standards such as "I Got Rhythm", "Let's Call the Whole Thing Off", "Nice Work If You Can Get It" and "Oh, Lady Be Good". From 1962 onwards he took part in nine jazz recording sessions. As a session musician he worked with the Beatles and Elton John, and many others, including Albert Lee, Mungo Jerry (Dawn), Mike Cooper/Michael Gibbs (Places I Know, 1971), Gerry Rafferty (Can I Have My Money Back?, 1971), Henry Mancini (Pink Panther), Mike Batt and Allan Clarke. He also did film work as a fiddle player.

Van Derrick was well known in the jazz world, and contributed to acceptance of violin as a jazz instrument, in part in his role as a teacher. He knew Stéphane Grappelli, taught at the Guildhall School of Music and Drama and the Royal Academy of Music, and taught several jazz violinists privately including Chris Garrick, Faith Brackenbury, and Van Derrick's successor at RAM Graham Clark.

== Sources ==
- John Chilton Who’s Who of British Jazz. London: Continuum, 2004
