= Mike Daniels (musician) =

British jazz trumpeter and bandleader

- Born: Mike John Brett Daniels; 23 April 1928; Norbiton, Kingston-upon-Thames, Surrey
- Died: 18 October 2016 (aged 88)
- Genres: Trad Jazz, Jazz
- Occupations: Bandleader, Trumpeter
- Instrument: Trumpet
- Years active: 1948-2016

Mike John Brett Daniels (23 April 1928 – 18 October 2016) was a British dixieland revivalist jazz trumpeter and bandleader born in Norbiton near Kingston-upon-Thames, Surrey.

Daniels had an interest in jazz at a very young age while studying at Aldenham School from the age of 13 in 1941 as a pupil until 1945. He took up the trumpet aged just 16 in 1944 and his family moved to Stanmore, Middlesex, in 1946. He organised a new group called the 'Stanmore Stompers' a year later in 1947.

He is probably best known for his work with his own seven piece group 'The Delta Jazzmen'. He led this group from 1948 to 1974 and again in the 1990s. He moved to Spain briefly in the mid-1960s.

Very little recorded output exists during his lifetime of playing except for two albums worth of material, one of which was entitled Mike on Mike from 1960. However, there exists some well recorded performances by the Delta Jazzmen which featured Daniels from 1958 to 1963, along with additional input from trombone player Gordon Blundy and John Barnes on reed instruments. The rhythm section is accompanied on these works by banjo-tuba-drums. Daniels was regarded as an ensemble-orientated player who provided a solid lead combined with laid-back solos. The British Lake Label produced 'Limited Edition' recordings of Daniels' work.

Daniels' aspired to reproduce the original styles of King Oliver, Jelly Roll Morton, Louis Armstrong and others as authentically as possible during live performance.

Some of his other bands have featured talents such as Keith Nichols and John Chilton.

He died on 18 October 2016 at the age of 88.

== Discography ==
- Together Again (Lake, 1999)
