= Brian Lemon =

British jazz pianist and arranger

- Born: Brian Lemon; 11 February 1937; Nottingham, England
- Died: 11 October 2014 (aged 77) Bexhill-on-Sea, Sussex, England
- Genre: Jazz
- Occupation: Musician
- Instrument: Piano
- Years active: 1956-2005

Brian Lemon (11 February 1937 – 11 October 2014) was a British jazz pianist and arranger.

== Biography ==
Lemon was born in Nottingham, England. After leaving school in the 1950s, he began playing professionally at Nottingham's Palais de Danse and other local venues.

He moved to London, aged 19, in 1956 to join Freddy Randall's group. After that he worked with George Chisholm, Kenny Baker and Sandy Brown. Over the years, he also worked with Benny Goodman, Charlie Watts, Scott Hamilton, Buddy Tate, Milt Jackson, Ben Webster, and Digby Fairweather. From 1961 to 1963, he led his own trio at the comedian Peter Cook’s club, The Establishment, in Soho, London.

He led an octet which played songs by Billy Strayhorn. Lemon worked as a regular session musician with many groups which were recorded at the BBC's Maida Vale Studios in London for broadcast on Sunday night's BBC Radio 1's Sounds of Jazz introduced by Peter Clayton in the early 1970s.

Lemon recorded a sequence of 27 albums for Zephyr over 10 years from 1994, though not always as leader. Lemon had a remarkable skill as an accompanist, together with his in-depth knowledge of the classic American song repertoire. Zephyr was set up by retired businessman John Bune, to specifically record Lemon's work. Lemon retired from music around 2005 after the development of severe osteoarthritis in his hands.

Adelaide Hall recorded an album with The Brian Lemon Half-Dozen. A rare copy is at the British Library.

== Personal life ==
Lemon married Debby Holley in 1965. They eventually separated although did not divorce. Holley, her son and Susan Burgess, his partner, all survive him.

Lemon died in October 2014, at the age of 77.

== Discography ==
=== As leader ===
| Year recorded | Title | Label | Notes |
|---|---|---|---|
| 1970 | Our Kind of Music | 77 Records | |
| 1983 | Jazz-London 29 / 30 | BBC Transcription Service | Live. Split album with Nucleus. |
| 1995 | Over the Rainbow | Zephyr | with Derek Watkins |
| 1995 | A Beautiful Friendship | Zephyr | with Roy Williams |
| 1995 | How Long Has This Been Going On | Zephyr | with Roy Williams |
| 1996 | Old Hands, Young Minds | Zephyr | with Alan Barnes |
| 1996 | Lemon Looks Back | Zephyr | |
| 1999–2000 | My Shining Hour | Zephyr | |

=== As sideman ===
- Cookin' (Bellaphon, 1989) – live
- Charly Antolini Meets Dick Morrissey (Bell, 1992) – live
- The Great British Jazz Band (Candid, 1993)
- In Town, Spike Robinson (Hep Jazz, 1993)
- Love Walked In, Tony Coe (Zephyr Records, 2008)
