= Scrapper Blackwell =

American blues guitarist and singer (1903–1962)

Background information
- Born: Francis Hillman Blackwell; February 21, 1903; Darlington County, South Carolina, U.S.
- Died: October 7, 1962 (aged 59) Indianapolis, Indiana, U.S.
- Genres: Piedmont blues
- Occupation: Musician
- Instruments: Guitar; vocals
- Years active: 1928–1936; 1958–1962
- Label: Vocalion

Francis Hillman "Scrapper" Blackwell (February 21, 1903 – October 7, 1962) was an American blues guitarist and singer, best known as half of the guitar-piano duo he formed with Leroy Carr in the late 1920s and early 1930s.

He was a 2024 inductee to the Blues Hall of Fame.

== Career ==
Blackwell was born in Syracuse, South Carolina, an unincorporated settlement in Darlington County. He was one of 16 children of Payton and Elizabeth Blackwell, and is reported to have been part Cherokee. He grew up in and spent most of his life in Indianapolis, Indiana, to which he moved at the age of three. He was given the nickname "Scrapper" by his grandmother, because of his fiery nature. His father played the fiddle, but Blackwell was a self-taught guitarist, building his first guitar out of a cigar box, wood and wire. He also learned to play the piano, occasionally performing professionally. By his teens, Blackwell was a part-time musician, traveling as far as Chicago. He was known for being withdrawn and hard to work with, but he established a rapport with the pianist Leroy Carr, whom he met in Indianapolis in the mid-1920s, and they had a productive working relationship. Carr convinced Blackwell to record with him for Vocalion Records in 1928; the result was "How Long, How Long Blues", the biggest blues hit of that year.

Blackwell also made solo recordings for Vocalion, including "Kokomo Blues", which was transformed into "Old Kokomo Blues" by Kokomo Arnold and later reworked as "Sweet Home Chicago" by Robert Johnson. Blackwell and Carr toured throughout the American Midwest and South between 1928 and 1935 as stars of the blues circuit, recording over 100 sides. "Prison Bound Blues" (1928), "Mean Mistreater Mama" (1934), and "Blues Before Sunrise" (1934) were popular tracks.

Blackwell made several solo excursions. A 1931 visit to Richmond, Indiana, to record at Gennett studios is noteworthy. Blackwell was dissatisfied with the lack of credit given his contributions with Carr; the situation was remedied by Vocalion's Mayo Williams after his 1931 breakaway: in all future recordings, Blackwell and Carr received equal songwriting credits and equal status in recording contracts. Blackwell's last recording session with Carr was in February 1935, for Bluebird Records. The session ended bitterly, as both musicians left the studio mid-session and on bad terms, stemming from payment disputes. Two months later Blackwell received a phone call informing him of Carr's death due to heavy drinking and nephritis. Blackwell soon recorded a tribute to his musical partner of seven years ("My Old Pal Blues"). After the death of Carr, Blackwell did a few recordings with piano player Dot Rice, without much success; the song "No Good Woman Blues" shows Blackwell as the singer. A short time later Blackwell retired from the music industry.

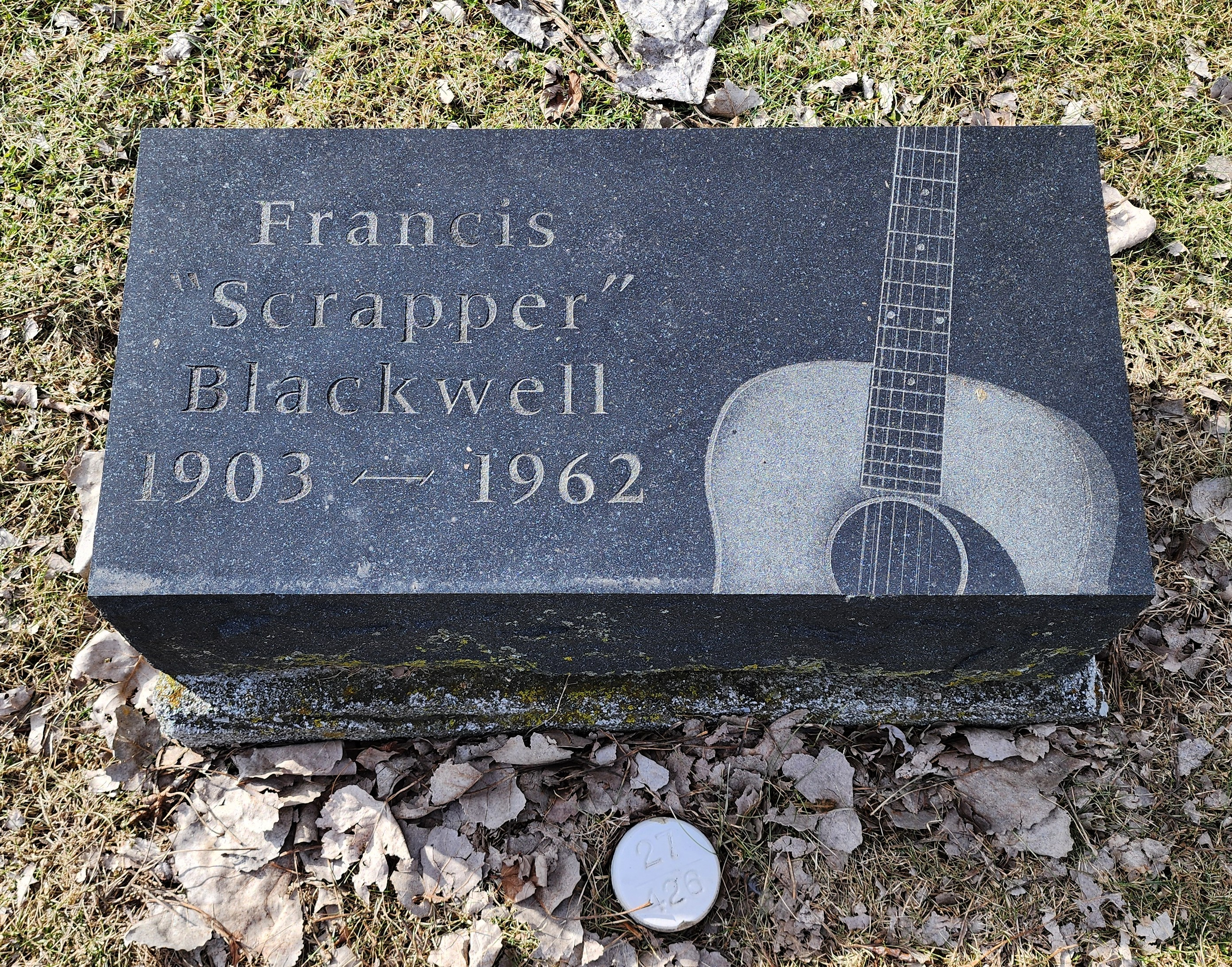
Blackwell's grave marker in New Crown Cemetery, Indianapolis

Blackwell returned to music in the late 1950s. He was recorded by Colin C. Pomroy in June 1958 (those recordings were released in 1967 on the Collector label). Soon afterwards he was recorded by Duncan P. Schiedt for Doug Dobell's 77 Records. Blackwell was ready to resume his blues career, when he was shot and killed in a mugging in an Indianapolis alley, in October 1962 at the age of 59. He is buried in New Crown Cemetery, in Indianapolis. His stature as a musician can be seen by Bob Dylan's comment: "There is a strong line in all our music that can be traced back directly to Scrapper Blackwell. He was a truly great musician who did deserve more than was ever given him".

== See also ==
- List of unsolved murders (1900–1979)

== Partial discography ==
=== Studio albums ===
- Blues Before Sunrise (77 Records, 1960)
- Mr. Scrapper's Blues (Bluesville, 1962)
- The Blues of Brooks Berry & Scrapper Blackwell: My Heart Struck Sorrow (Bluesville, 1963)

=== Compilations ===
- The Virtuoso Guitar of Scrapper Blackwell (Yazoo, 1970)
- Naptown Blues 1929–1934, Leroy Carr and Scrapper Blackwell (Yazoo, 1973)
- Blues That Make Me Cry (Agram, 1981)
- Great Piano-Guitar Duets (1929–1935), Leroy Carr and Scrapper Blackwell (Old Tramp, 1987)
- Leroy Carr & Scrapper Blackwell 1929–1935 (Best of Blues, 1989)
- Scrapper Blackwell with Brooks Berry (Document, 1994)
- Complete Recorded Works, Vols. 1 and 2 (Document, 1996)
