= John Barnes (English musician) =

English jazz saxophone and clarinet player (1932–2022)

- Born: John Barnes; 15 May 1932; Manchester, England
- Died: 19 April 2022 (aged 89)
- Genres: Jazz; Dixieland Jazz
- Occupation: Musician
- Instruments: Saxophone; Clarinet; Flute

John Barnes (15 May 1932 – 19 April 2022) was a British jazz saxophonist and clarinettist, who played New Orleans-styled jazz in his early career, but later also played saxophones in the mainstream style. He was also a music composer for comedy shows, including Living Single.

== Biography ==
John Barnes was born in Manchester on 15 May 1932. He started out his career as a flügelhorn player in the early 1950s, although adapted his playing skills to the clarinet, an instrument he favoured. He played traditional jazz with Alan Elsdon, The Mike Daniels' Delta Jazzmen and also The Zenith Six. He continued and extended his career musically from 1967 with the Scottish dixieland jazz trumpet and cornet player Alex Welsh and his Jazz Band. He began playing alto, baritone, soprano saxophone and the flute. His association with Welsh lasted for 10 years until 1977. During this period he rose to fame in the jazz arena appearing at the Newport Jazz Festival aged 37 in 1969. His skills on baritone saxophone earned him a huge jazz fan base, some suggesting he was the best they had seen in Europe. After leaving Welsh, he worked as co-leader, with trombonist Roy Williams, of the Midnite Follies Orchestra which included many American jazz artists.

Barnes also worked with many notable artists, including Janet Jackson, Leo Sayer, Humphrey Lyttelton, Gerry Mulligan, Spike Robinson, Bobby Wellins and Keith Nichols. In May 1964, after a bad car crash Barnes as a member of Alex Welsh band was replaced by Al Gay, until his full rehabilitation. Barnes considered Coleman Hawkins and Johnny Hodges to be his two main saxophone influences throughout his career.

== Personal life and death ==
In 2011, while on holiday in Greece, Barnes suffered a stroke. As a result of his stroke, on 9 February 2012, a benefit concert was held for Barnes at the 100 Club in Oxford Street, London.

Barnes died on 19 April 2022, at the age of 89.
