= Cookin' =

Cookin' may refer to:

- Cookin' (Booker Ervin album), 1960
- Cookin' (Charly Antolini and Dick Morrissey album), 1989
- Cookin' (Paul Gonsalves album), 1957
- Cookin' with the Miles Davis Quintet, a 1957 album
- Cookin' with the Miracles, a 1961 album
- "Cookin", a song by Fat Joe and Remy Ma from Plata O Plomo
- Nanta (theatrical show), or Cookin, a South Korean musical comedy show

== See also ==
- Cooking, preparation of food for consumption
