= Stan Barker =

English jazz pianist (1926–1997)

- Born: Stan Barker; 24 May 1926; Clitheroe, Lancashire, England
- Died: 2 July 1997 (aged 71) Clitheroe, Lancashire, England
- Genres: Jazz
- Instrument: Piano
- Labels: Nelson; Essex
- Formerly of: Digby Fairweather band

Stan Barker (24 May 1926 – 2 July 1997) was an English jazz pianist.

== Early life ==
Barker was born in Clitheroe, Lancashire, the son of Richard and Winnie Barker; his parents were both musical. As a child he learned to play harmonica and banjo, and to yodel. His school headmaster, Laurence Hardy, encouraged him to perform in concerts and shows.

== Career ==
Barker played guitar and piano with the East Lancashire Regiment Band during his National Service in the Army. He was a recreational and part-time musician, playing popular music at weekend dance events. He began arranging music for ensembles as a side project, was a musical director at a hotel for several years, and accompanied touring acts.

Barker was a sales manager, aged 50, when he became a full-time jazz musician and formed the Stan Barker Trio. The trio played with trombonist Roy Williams in 1991. Barker made recordings and played gigs with such artists as Digby Fairweather, Al Grey, Buddy Tate, Al Wood, and Billy Butterfield.

In addition to teaching jazz, Barker taught in a variety of educational institutions, including the Royal Northern College of Music, the Belfast School of Music, Merseyside Arts, the Mid-Pennine Arts Association, South Wales Art Association, and the Southport Arts Centre. A 1979 profile of Barker proposed that "his treatment of the classic standards, his inventiveness and sheer fluency, place him rightly in the same category as Oscar Peterson."

== Personal life ==
Barker was married to Betty Barker; their son Kenneth was also a musician. Barker died in 1997, at the age of 71.

== Discography ==
- Stan Barker Trio-Volume 1 (Nelson, 1979)
- Stan Barker and Digby Fairweather: Let's Duet (Essex, 1984)
