= William Hastie (disambiguation) =

William Hastie (1842–1903) was a Scottish clergyman and theologian.

William Hastie may also refer to:

- William Hastie (architect) (1763–1832), Russian architect of Scottish descent
- William H. Hastie (1904–1976), American politician and civil rights activist
- Will Hastie, musician featured in British jazz band Midnite Follies Orchestra
