= Eddie Thompson (musician) =

British jazz pianist (1925–1986)

- Born: Edgar Charles Thompson; 31 May 1925; London, England
- Died: 6 November 1986 (aged 61) London, England
- Genre: Jazz
- Occupation: Pianist
- Instrument: Piano
- Years active: 1947–1986

Edgar Charles Thompson, known professionally as Eddie Thompson (31 May 1925 – 6 November 1986) was a British jazz pianist.

== Biography ==
Thompson was born blind in London, England. After studying at the same school for the blind as George Shearing, he recorded with Victor Feldman in the late 1940s and also with the Carlo Krahmer Band at the Paris Jazz Fair in 1949.

In the 1950s, he worked with Tony Crombie (making records with Crombie under his own name), Vic Ash, Freddy Randall and Tommy Whittle and was house pianist at Ronnie Scott's from 1959 until 1960. From 1962 to 1972, he lived and worked in the US at Hickory House, a well-known jazz club (started up in 1933) at 52nd Street, Manhattan, New York. He led his own trio featuring Len Skeat and Martin Drew, which recorded an album with Spike Robinson. Thompson also formed a duo with Roger Kellaway. Thompson was considered by many to be a 'dazzlingly inventive player' during his early recording career.

Thompson was recorded in the early 1980s by Hep Records, including Memories of You (1983).

He was known to have used the Underground to get to the clubs in London. He had a lifelong smoking habit which caused him to develop emphysema, which contributed to his early death in London in November 1986, at the age of 61. At the time of his death he was noted as being at "the height of his powers" as well as having a considerable musical repertoire.

== Bibliography ==
- The Rough Guide to Jazz, Ian Carr, Digby Fairweather, Brian Priestley, Charles Alexander - 2004, ISBN 9781843532569
