= Pete Strange =

English jazz trombonist, arranger, and composer (1938–2004)

- Born: Peter Charles Strange; 19 December 1938; Plaistow, Newham, London, England
- Died: 14 August 2004 (aged 65) Banstead, Surrey, England
- Genres: Jazz, Dixieland
- Occupations: Musician; Arranger; Composer
- Instruments: Trombone
- Years active: 1957–2004

Peter Charles Strange (19 December 1938 – 14 August 2004) was an English jazz trombonist, arranger and composer.

== Biography ==
Born in Plaistow, Newham, London, England, Strange played violin as a child before switching to trombone as a teenager.

His first major gig was with Eric Silk and his Southern Jazz Band when he was just 18 years old. In 1957, Silk's clarinetist Teddy Layton split off and formed his own band, and Strange went with him. He was called up for National Service in 1958 and became a bandsman in the Lancashire Fusiliers, whilst serving in Cyprus. Following this Strange played with Sonny Morris, Charlie Gall, and Ken Sims, then joined Bruce Turner from 1961 to 1964.

After 1964, Turner went into partial retirement for about 10 years, playing off and on with Freddy Randall, Joe Daniels, and Ron Russell, but not carrying any full-time associations. He returned to play with Turner again permanently in 1974, and in 1978 co-founded the Midnite Follies Orchestra with Alan Elsdon.

In 1980, he founded the five-trombone ensemble, Five-A-Slide, which featured Roy Williams and Campbell Burnap.

Strange joined Humphrey Lyttelton's band in 1983, and remained with the ensemble until he died. With the other members of the Lyttelton band, he performed on the 2001 Radiohead album Amnesiac. He also played with his own side group, the Great British Jazz Band.

Pete Strange died of cancer in Banstead, Surrey, in August 2004, aged 65.
