= John Armatage =

English jazz swing drummer and arranger (1929–2013)

- Born: John Sinclair Armatage; 5 August 1929; Newcastle upon Tyne, England
- Died: 13 November 2013 (aged 84) Surrey, England
- Genre: Jazz
- Occupation: Drummer
- Instrument: Drums

John Sinclair Armatage (5 August 1929 – 13 November 2013) was an English jazz swing drummer and arranger.

== Life and career ==
John Sinclair Armatage was born in Newcastle upon Tyne, England on 5 August 1929.

He began professional work in 1957 when he gigged with John Chilton and then recorded, toured and made a film with Bruce Turner, the film called Living Jazz (1962). Armatage played with artists such as Pete Allen and Terry Lightfoot. He also collaborated on work with Pee Wee Russell.

Armatage died in Surrey on 13 November 2013, aged 84.
