= Roy Williams (trombonist) =

English jazz trombonist (born 1937)

Roy Williams MBE
- Born: Roy Williams; 7 March 1937 (age 89); Salford, Greater Manchester, England
- Genres: Jazz
- Occupation: Musician
- Instrument: Trombone
- Years active: 1955–present

Roy Williams MBE (born 7 March 1937) is an English jazz trombonist.

== Early life ==
Williams was born in Salford, Greater Manchester, England. He learned piano as a youth and did not play the trombone until he was 18. He served his National Service in the military in the late 1950s, then joined the trad jazz group of trumpeter Mike Peters and worked with Terry Lightfoot in the early 1960s.

== Career ==
In 1965, Williams became a member of Alex Welsh's band, which accompanied Ruby Braff, Wild Bill Davison, and Bud Freeman. Williams remained with Welsh until 1978, also collaborating with bandmate John Barnes in a side ensemble. He then worked with Humphrey Lyttelton (1978–1983), and in 1980 played with the PizzaExpress All-Stars and Benny Waters.

He left Lyttelton's ensemble in 1983 and was a regular performer at festivals in the 1980s and 1990s. He was a sideman for Doc Cheatham, Jim Galloway, Buddy Tate, the Harlem Blues and Jazz Band, the World's Greatest Jazz Band, Peanuts Hucko, Bent Persson, Bobby Rosengarden, Stan Barker, Bob Wilber, Digby Fairweather, Pete Strange, and Keith Smith.

Williams co-led a swing-oriented quintet in 1998 with saxophonist Danny Moss. Their musical collaboration produced Steamers! for the Nagel-Heyer Records label.

In July 2016, Williams performed at the Edinburgh Jazz Festival with bandleader John Burgess at a tribute concert entitled Remembering Alex Welsh.

Williams was appointed Member of the Order of the British Empire (MBE) in the 2020 Birthday Honours for services to jazz.

== Bibliography ==
- "Roy Williams". The New Grove Dictionary of Jazz. 2nd edition, ed. Barry Kernfeld.
