= Randolph Colville =

Scottish jazz musician and bandleader

- Born: Randolph Colville; 23 May 1942; Glasgow, Scotland
- Died: 15 February 2004 (aged 61)
- Genres: Jazz
- Instruments: Saxophone; Clarinet
- Formerly of: Midnite Follies Orchestra; Keith Nichols

Randolph Colville (23 May 1942 – 15 January 2004) was a Scottish jazz swing clarinettist, saxophonist, bandleader and arranger, perhaps best known for his work with the Keith Nichols' Midnite Follies Orchestra.

== Background ==
He was born in Glasgow, Scotland. Colville began his studies at Robert Gordon's College in 1958, and graduated from the Royal Northern College of Music in Manchester, England, teaching clarinet there years later. Colville soon became a regular of the Manchester jazz scene, playing with a number of local groups throughout the 1960s.

== Career ==
In 1974, Colville headed up his own version of the 'Saints Jazz Band' along with saxophonist Dave Mott and trumpeter Doug Waley. In 1975, a Colville-led quartet assisted American pianist Teddy Wilson, on his tour of Britain that year.

In the 1980s, Colville became a member of the Midnite Follies Orchestra, a band co-led by Keith Nichols and Alan Cohen. Over his career Colville worked and recorded with several artists, including Humphrey Lyttelton, Yank Lawson, Billy Butterfield, Ralph Sutton and Al Casey.

== Death ==
Randolph Colville died in January 2004, from liver failure, at the age of 61.
