= Fellside Recordings =

English record label

- Founded: 1976
- Founder: Paul Adams; Linda Adams
- Distributor: Proper Music Distribution
- Genre: Folk, jazz
- Country of origin: England
- Location: Workington, Cumbria
- Official website: www.fellside.com

Fellside Recordings is a British independent record label, formed by Paul Adams and Linda Adams in 1976 in Workington, Cumbria, and still run by them. From prison in the case of Paul Stuart Adams.

Paul Adams toured semi-professionally with the Barry Skinner Folk Group in his teens. He and Linda married in 1974. Fellside started as a folk music label. They issued jazz under the name LAKE, and children's records as "small folk". Most of the Fellside catalogue was recorded and produced by Paul Adams. In 2007, BBC Radio celebrated the company with a programme called "30 Years of Fellside". Three of their acts, John Spiers & Jon Boden, Nancy Kerr & James Fagan, and Kirsty McGee were nominated for BBC Folk Awards, and two of the acts were winners on the night. The label has won many awards including 12 from the Music Retailers Association. LAKE has won a BT British Jazz Award and Paul Adams was nominated for a BBC Jazz Award.

The Amazon website lists over 130 titles still in print, including albums by Spiers and Boden, Nancy Kerr & James Fagan, Dr Faustus, 422, Fribo, Hughie Jones, A. L. Lloyd, Peter Bellamy, James Keelaghan, Clive Gregson, The Queensberry Rules, Jez Lowe, Last Orders, Bram Taylor, and Grace Notes. Their anthologies have included songs by Maddy Prior, Richard Thompson, Frankie Armstrong, John Kirkpatrick and Martin Carthy. Fellside, along with Topic Records, are the two most significant and longest serving record labels for traditional music in the UK.

On the jazz side, LAKE Records's roster includes George Melly, Digby Fairweather, Ottilie Patterson, Phil Mason, John Hallam, The Fryer-Barnhart International All Star Jazz Band, The Savannah Jazz Band, Spats Langham, Debbie Arthurs and Keith Nichols.

In 2004, they started reissuing recordings from the defunct jazz label Record Supervision. This included the reissue of albums by Humphrey Lyttelton, Acker Bilk, Alex Welsh, Ken Colyer, Chris Barber, Terry Lightfoot, Sandy Brown, and Archie Semple. Singsong described this set of reissues as "A milestone in British jazz". They have a "Vintage" Series as well as a series recorded at the Dancing Slipper Jazz Club in Nottingham in the 1960s.

In 2022, founder Paul Adams was jailed for historic offences. He was further convicted in 2026 including on a charge of abusing a young person who was on work experience at the studio.

Adams was jailed for seven more years on 6 February 2026, with the judge describing him as a 'monster' and noting that he struggled to find any mitigating circumstances whatsoever in Adams' case.

== Discography ==
=== LPs ===
- FE001 Terry Docherty – Teller of Tales. 1976
- FE002 The Best of BBC Radio Carlisle's Folk Workshop. 1976
- FE003 Geoff Purvis – The Border Fiddler. 1976
- FE004 Dave Walters – Comes Sailing in. 1977
- FE005 Farmstead – The Sheep & The Hay. 1977
- FE006 Paul & Linda Adams – Among the Old Familiar Mountains, 1978
- FE007 The Border Country Dance Band. 1977
- FE008 Robbie Ellis – Under Beacon's Brow. 1977
- FE009 Brian Dewhurst – Follow That With Your Sealions. 1977
- FE010 The Packmen's Blue Album. 1977
- FE011 Barry Skinner with Geoff Lakeman – Bushes & Briars. 1978
- FE012 The Wassailers. 1978
- FE013 Various Artists – Canny Cumberland. 1979
- FE014 Greg Stephens & Crookfinger Jack – The Beggar Boy of the North. 1979
- FE015 The Rockytops – Life Can Be Beautiful. 1978
- FE016 The Gateway Jazzband with George Chisholm. 1979
- FE017 Roy Harris – The Rambling Soldier. 1979
- FE018 Steve Turner – Outstack. 1979
- FE019 Woodbine Lizzie By Numbers. 1979
- FE020 The Border Dance Band at Gretna Hall. 1980
- FE021 Colin Thompson – Three Knights. 1980
- FE022 An Evening With Hoghton Band. 1980
- FE023 Jez Lowe. 1980
- FE024 Pat Knowles – Standard Settings. 1980
- FE025 A Night Out with Woodbine Lizzie. 1981
- FE026 Gerry Hallom – Travellin' Down the Castlereagh. 1981
- FE027 Martyn Wyndham–Read – Emu Plains. 1981
- FE028 Hoghton Band – Dance & Enjoy the Pride of Lancashire. 1981
- FE029 Rob Gordon's Fourth Caledonian Ball. 1982
- FE030 Steve Turner – Jigging One Now. 1982
- FE031 Sara Grey & Ellie Ellis – A Breath of Fresh Air. 1982
- FE032 Peter Bellamy – Keep On Kipling. 1982
- FE033 Bobby Eaglesham – Weather the Storm. 1982
- FE034 Jez Lowe – The Old Durham Road. 1983
- FE035 Jolly Jack – Rolling Down to Old Maui. 1983
- FE036 Gerry Hallom – A Run a Minute. 1983
- FE037 Swan Arcade – Together Forever. 1983
- FE038 Richard Grainger – Herbs On the Heart. 1984
- FE039 Sara Grey & Ellie Ellis – Making the Air Resound. 1984
- FE040 Hoghton Band Play Your Requests. 1984
- FE041 Bram Taylor – Bide A While. 1984
- FE042 Steve Turner – Eclogue. 1984
- FE043 Life & Times – Strawplait & Bonelace. 1984
- FE044 Roy Harris – Utter Simplicity. 1985
- FE045 Lancashire Fayre – Not Easily Forgotten. 1985
- FE046 Rhiannon – Birds of Rhiannon. 1985
- FE047 Linda Adams, John Bowden, Martin Carthy, Roy Harris, Jez Lowe – A Selection

from The Penguin Book of English Folk Songs. 1985

- FE048 Threeway Street – Drunkards & Lovers. 1985
- FE049 Jez Lowe – Galloways. 1985
- FE050 Various Artists – Flash Company. 1986
- FE051 Brian Peters – Persistence of Memory. 1985
- FE052 Mark T & The Brickbats – Johnny There. 1986
- FE053 Ian McGillivray – Rolling Home. 1986
- FE054 Swan Arcade – Diving for Pearls. 1986
- FE055 Jez Lowe & Jake Walton – Two a Roue. 1986
- FE056 Jill & Bernard Blackwell – Adventures of Notion. 1986
- FE057 Bram Taylor – Dreams & Songs to Sing. 1986
- FE058 Steve Turner – Braiding. 1987
- FE059 Anonyma – Burnt Feathers. 1987
- FE060 Ian Walker – Flying High. 1987
- FE061 Patti Reid. 1987
- FE062 Zydeco Ceilidh Band. 1987
- FE063 Ken Campbell – Going Solo. 1988
- FE064 Marilyn Middleton Pollock – Nobody Knows You. 1988
- FE065 Dave Goulder – The Man Who Put the Engine in the Chip Shop. 1988
- FE066 Alasdair Robertson – Friends & Companions. 1988
- FE067 Jolly Jack – A Long Time Travelling. 1988
- FE068 Bisiker & Romanov. 1988
- FE069 Strangefolk – Unhand Me You Bearded Loon. 1988
- FE070 Jez Lowe – Bad Penny. 1988
- FE071 Life & Times – Shropshire Iron. 1989
- FE072 Cockersdale – Doin' the Manch. 1989
- FE073 Ian Walker – Shadows in Time. 1989
- FE074 Gerry Hallom – Old Australian Ways. 1989
- FE075 Bram Taylor – Taylor Made. 1989
- FE077 Phil Hare – Living On Credit. 1990
- FE079 Jez Lowe & The Bad Pennies – Briefly On the Street. 1990

=== CDs (up to FECD100) ===
- FECD3 Geoff Purvis – The Border Fiddler
- FECD27 Martyn Wyndham-Read – Emu Plains 25th Anniversary Reissue Series
- FECD34 Jez Lowe – The Old Durham Road
- FECD47 Linda Adams, John Bowden, Martin Carthy, Roy Harris, Jez Lowe – A Selection From The Penguin Book of English Folk Songs. 1985
- FECD61 Patti Reid. 1987
- FECD70 Jez Lowe – Bad Penny
- FECD72 Cockersdale – Doin' the Manch 25th Anniversary Reissue Series
- FECD76 Ian Bruce – Blodwen's Dream. 1990
- FECD78 Classic Anne Briggs. 1990
- FECD79 Jez Lowe & The Bad Pennies – Briefly On the Street. 1990
- FECD80 Gill Bowman – City Love. 1990
- FECD81 Hughie Jones – Hughie's Ditty Bag. 1991
- FECD82 Hamish Bayne & Martin Cole – Making Music. 1991
- FECD83 Mick Bisiker – Home Again. 1991
- FECD84 Martyn Wyndham-Read – Mussels On a Tree. 1991
- FECD85 Ian Bruce – Out of Office. 1992
- FECD86 Marilyn Middleton Pollock – A Doll's House. 1992
- FECD87 Various Artists – Voices, English Traditional Songs. 1992
- FECD88 Ian Walker & Setanta – Crossing the Borderlines. 1993
- FECD89 Jez Lowe – Backshift. 1992
- FECD90 The Paul Brennan Band – Fire in the Soul. 1993
- FECD91 Wizz & Simeon Jones – Late Nights & Long Days. 1993
- FECD92 Bram Taylor – Further Horizons. 1993
- FECD93 Christine Kydd – Heading Home. 1993
- FECD94 Jez Lowe & The Bad Pennies – Bede Weeps. 1993
- FECD95 The Ragtime Millionaires – Making A Million. 1993
- FECD96 Edgerton Layhe – Rough & Tumble. 1993
- FECD97 John Wright – Ride the Rolling Skies. 1993
- FECD98 Classic A. L. Lloyd. 1994
- FECD99 Heather Innes – Coanineadh, Songs from the Heart. 1994
- FECD100 Various Artists – Banklands (The Story of Fellside Records). 1994

=== CDs (FECD101 to FECD200) ===
- FECD101 Cockersdale – Been Around for Years. 1994
- FECD102 Martyn Wyndham–Read – Sunlit Plains. 1994
- FECD103 Pete Oakley – Ghost in the City. 1995
- FECD104 Sisters Unlimited – No Bed of Roses. 1995
- FECD105 Classic Peggy Seeger ft Tom Paley. 1996
- FECD106 The John Wright Band – The Things We've Handed Down. 1996
- FECD107 Sandra & Nancy Kerr – Neat and Complete. 1996
- FECD108 Dick Wardell – Street Life Blues. 1996
- FECD109 The Ragtime Millionaires – Life Is Good Sometimes. 1996
- FECD110 Various Artists – Ballads. 1997
- FECD111 Bob Fox & Benny Graham – How Are You Off for Coals? 1996
- FECD112 Lucky Bags – Food for Thought. 1996
- FECD113 The Rufus Crisp Experience (Dave Arthur & Barry Murphy) – Chickens Are A–Crowing. 1997
- FECD114 Rick Kemp – Escape. 1997
- FECD115 Martyn Wyndham–Read – Beneath a Southern Sky. 1997
- FECD116 Frankie Armstrong with John Kirkpatrick & Maddy Prior – Till the Grass O'ergrew the Corn. 1997
- FECD117 Gordeanna McCulloch – Sheath & Knife. 1997
- FECD118 Keith Kendrick – Home Ground. 1997
- FECD119 Voice Union (Liliana Bertolo, Evelyne Girardon, Sandra Kerr with special guest Maddy Prior). 1997
- FECD120 Bram Taylor – Pick of the Grinner. 1997
- FECD121 The John Wright Band – Other Roads. 1997
- FECD122 Bob Davenport & The Rakes – The Red Haired Lad. 1997
- FECD123 Cockersdale – Wide Open Skies. 1997
- FECD124 Bob Fox & Stu Luckley – Box of Gold. 1997
- FECD125 John Kirkpatrick & Others – Wassail! 1997
- FECD126 Grace Notes – Red Wine & Promises. 1998
- FECD127 Nancy Kerr & James Fagan – Starry Gazy Pie. 1997
- FECD128 Keith Hills – Recovery. 1997
- FECD129 Gordon Tyrrall – A Distance from the Town. 1998
- FECD130 Peggy Seeger with Irene Scott – Almost Commercially Viable. 1998
- FECD131 Various Artists – Fyre & Sworde, Songs of the Border Reivers. 1998
- FECD132 Ushna – Twice Brewed. 1998
- FECD133 Rick Kemp – Spies. 1998
- FECD134 Steve Tilston – Solorubato. 1998
- FECD135 John Conolly & Pete Sumner – Trawlertown. 1998
- FECD136 Simon Haworth – Coast to Coast. 1998
- FECD137 Sandra Kerr, Nancy Kerr & James Fagan – Scalene. 1999
- FECD138 Lucky Bags – Delight in Disorder. 1999
- FECD139 Buz Collins – Water and Rain. 1999
- FECD140 Jolly Jack & Others – Rolling Down to Old Maui. 1999
- FECD141 Clive Gregson – Happy Hour. 1999
- FECD142 Kathy Stewart – Celestial Shoes. 1999
- FECD143 Johnny Silvo & Diz Disley – Blues in the Back Yard. 1999
- FECD144 Frankie Armstrong – Garden of Love. 1999
- FECD145 Nancy Kerr & James Fagan – Steely Water. 1999
- FECD146 Martyn Wyndham–Read and No Man's Band – Beyond the Red Horizon. 1999
- FECD147 Hughie Jones – Seascape. 1999
- FECD148 The Bram Taylor Collection – Singing! 1999
- FECD149 Mad Pudding – Grand Hotel. 1999
- FECD150 Tryckster – When the Stone Is Exposed. 1999
- FECD151 Frankie Armstrong – Lovely On the Water. 2000
- FECD152 Sandra Kerr – Yellow, Red and Gold. 2000
- FECD153 422 – One. 2000
- FECD154 Alistair McCulloch – Highly Strung. 2000
- FECD155 Peta Webb & Ken Hall – As Close As Can Be. 2000
- FECD156 Various – Flash Company Celebration 25 years Fellside 1976–2001, 25th Anniversary Reissue Series.
- FECD157 Martyn Wyndham–Read and No Man's Band – Where Ravens Feed. 2001
- FECD158 Various Artists – Voices in Harmony, English Traditional Songs. 2001
- FECD159 Bram Taylor – Fragile Peace. 2001
- FECD160 Swan Arcade – Round Again 25th Anniversary Reissue Series. 2001
- FECD161 John Spiers & Jon Boden – Through and Through. 2001
- FECD162 Peter Bellamy – Mr Bellamy, Mr Kipling and the Tradition 25th Anniversary Reissue Series. 2001
- FECD163 Grace Notes – Anchored to the Time. 2001
- FECD164 Clive Gregson – Comfort & Joy. 2001
- FECD165 Little Johnny England. 2001
- FECD166 Little Johnny England – Merc & Cherokees. 2001
- FECD167 Nancy Kerr & James Fagan – Between the Dark and Light. 2002
- FECD168 Altar Native – Cumbria Odyssey. 2002
- FECD169 Clive Gregson – Carousel of Noise. 2002
- FECD170 Kirsty McGee – Honeysuckle. 2002
- FECD171 422 – New Numbers. 2003
- FECD172 Simon Haworth – Taking Routes. 2003
- FECD173 A.L. Lloyd – England & Her Traditional Songs. 2003
- FECD174 Andy May – The Yellow Haired Laddie (Northumbrian Smallpipes). 2003
- FECD175 John Spiers & Jon Boden – Bellow. 2003
- FECD176D Various Artists – Song Links, A Celebration of English Traditional Songs and their Australian variants
- FECD177 Dr Faustus – The First Cut. 2003
- FECD178 FolkESTRA North. 2003
- FECD179 Alistair McCulloch – Wired Up. 2003
- FECD180 The Witches of Elswick – Out of Bed. 2003
- FECD181 Benji Kirkpatck – Half a Fruit Pie. 2004
- FECD182 Various Artists – Fanfare for the South West. 2003
- FECD183 Bram Taylor – The Night Is Young. 2004
- FECD184 Clive Gregson – Long Story Short. 2004
- FECD185 Ed Rennie – Narrative. 2004
- FECD186 Jon Loomes – Fearful Symmetry. 2005
- FECD187 Peter Bellamy – Fair Annie. 2004
- FECD188 The Hoghton Band Collection – A Selection of English Country Dances. 2005
- FECD189 Dr Faustus – Wager. 2005
- FECD190D Various Artists – Song Links 2, A Celebration of English Traditional Songs and their American variants. 2005
- FECD191 422 – Major Third. 2005
- FECD192 Spiers & Boden – Tunes. 2005
- FECD193 Maddie Southorn – The Pilgrim Soul. 2005
- FECD194 Spiers & Boden – Songs. 2005
- FECD195 Kieron Means – Far As My Eyes Can See. 2005
- FECD196 Sara Grey – A Long Way From Home. 2005
- FECD197 Martyn Wyndham–Read and No Man's Band – Oceans in the Sky. 2005
- FECD198 Hughie Jones & Friends – Liverpool Connexions. 2005
- FECD199 Nancy Kerr & James Fagan – Strands of Gold. 2006
- FECD200 James Keelaghan – Then Again. 2006

=== CDs (from FECD201) ===
- FECD201 The Queensberry Rules – The Black Dog & Other Stories. 2006
- FECD202 Tom Kitching & Gren Bartley – Rushes 2007
- FECD203 Landmarks – 30 Years of Fellside Recording (3 CDs) 2006
- FECD204 James Keelaghan – A Few Simple Verses 2006
- FECD205 Fribo – The Ha' o' Habrahellia 2009
- FECD206 Bram Taylor – Song Singer 206
- FECD207 Last Orders 2007
- FECD208 Frankie Armstrong – Encouragement 2007
- FECD209 Grace Notes – Northern Tide 2007
- FECD210 The Queensberry Rules – Landlocked 2007
- FECD211 Kerr Fagan Harbron – Station House 2008
- FECD212 Crucible – Love & Money 2008
- FECD213 Jack McNeill & Charlie Heys – Light Up All the Beacons 2008
- FECD214 The Maerlock – Sofa 2008
- FECD215 Rachel & Lillias – Dear Someone 2008
- FECD216 Peter Bellamy – Fair England's Shore (Double CD) 2008
- FECD217 Phil Hulse – Unpredicted Storm 2008
- FECD218 Graham & Sam Pirt – Dance Ti Thee Daddy 2008
- FECD219 A.L. Lloyd – Ten Thousand Miles (Double CD) 2008
- FECD220 A.L. Lloyd – An Evening with ... 2010
- FECD221 Dave Goulder – The Golden Age of Steam 2008
- FECD222 Tom Kitching & Gren Bartley – Boundary 2009
- FECD223 Elbow Jane – 3–Side Island 2009
- FECD224 Andy May – Happy Hours 2009
- FECD225 Sara Grey – Sandy Boys 2009
- FECD226 Ken Campbell's Ideal Band 2009
- FECD227 The Queensberry Rules – Take Your Own Roads 2009
- FECD228 The Hut People (Sam Pirt & Gary Hammond) – Home Is Where the Hut Is 2009
- FECD229 Jack McNeill & Charlie Heys – The Northern Road 2009
- FECD230 Wendy Weatherby – A Shirt of Silk or Snow 2009
- FECD231 Joseph Topping – Ghosts in the Shadows 2010
- FECD232 Lizzie Nunnery – Company of Ghosts 2010
- FECD233 The Urban Folk Quartet 2011
- FECD234 Suntrap – Unravelling 2010
- FECD235 Ewan McLennan – Rags & Robes 2010
- FECD236 All Along the Wall – Various artists 2010
- FECD237 422 – Go Forth 2010
- FECD238 James Findlay – Sport and Play 2011
- FECD239 Pilgrims' Way – Wayside Courtesies 2011
- FECD240 AL Lloyd – Bramble Briars and Beams of the Sun 2011
- FECD241 Hedy West – Ballads and Songs from the Appalachians 2011
- FECD242 Elbow Jane – The Boldest Blood 2011
- FECD243 Martin & Carthy & Dave Swarbrick – Walnut Creek 2011
- FECD244 Fiona Cuthill & Stevie Lawrence – A Cruel Kindness 2011
- FECD245 Jack McNeill & Charlie Heys – Two Fine Days 2012
- FECD246 Bram Taylor – Jokers & Rogues 2012
- FECD247 Gren Bartley – Songs to Scythe Back the Overgrown 2012
- FECD248 The Hut People – Picnic 2012
- FECD249 Grace Notes – 20 2012
- FECD250 Ewan McLennan – The Last Bird to Sing 2012
- FECD251 Greg Russell and Ciaran Algar – The Queen's Lover 2012
- FECD252 James Findlay – Another Day Another Story 2012
- FECD253 Peter Bellamy – Barrack Room Ballads 2012
- FECD254 Hadrian's Union – In Your Own Time 2012
- FECD255 Joe Tilson – Embers 2012
- FECD256 Gren Bartley – Winter Fires 2013
- FECD257 James Findlay, Bella Hardy, Brian Peters, Lucy Ward – The Liberty to Choose – A Selection of Songs from

The New Penguin Book of English Folk Songs 2013

- FECD258 Hughie Jones – Maritime Miscellany 2013
- FECD259 Sara Grey with Kieron Means – Down in Old Dolores 2013
- FECD260 A.L. Lloyd – Turtle Dove 2013
- FECD261 Pete Morton – The Frappin' and Ramblin' Pete Morton 2014
- FECD262 Greg Russell and Ciaran Algar – The Call 2014
- FECD263 Ewan McLennan – Stories Still Untold 2014
- FECD264 The Hut People – Cabinet of Curiosities 2014
- FECD265 Joe Topping – The Vagrant Kings 2014
- FECD266 Jimmy Aldridge & Sid Goldsmith – Let the Wind Blow High or Low 2014
- FECD267 Tom Kitching – Interloper 2015
- FECD268 Gren Bartley – Magnificent Creatures 2015
- FECD269 Pete Morton – The Land of Time 2015
- FECD270 Ciaran Algar – The Final Waltz 2016
- FECD271 Pete Morton with Full House – Game of Life 2016
- FECD272 The Journey Continues...Fellside at 40 (1976 – 2016) [3 CDs] 2016
- FECD273 Pete Seeger in England 2016 [2 CDs - recorded London 1958 and Manchester 1964]
- FECD274 Pilgrims' Way – Red Diesel 2016
- FECD275 Greg Russell and Ciaran Algar – The Silent Majority 2016
- FECD276 Vic Gammon & Friends - Early Scottish Ragtime 2016
- FECD277 Ewan McLennan & George Monbiot - Breaking The Spell Of Loneliness 2016
- FECD278 Jimmy Aldridge & Sid Goldsmith – Night Hours 2016
- FECD279 Emily Sanders, Chris Parkinson & Pete Morton – The Magical Christmas Tree 2016
- FECD280 The Hut People – Routes 2017
- FECD281 Ciaran Algar - Inclined To Be Red 2017
- FECD282 Destination: Fellside Recordings 1976 - 2018. The end of an era for a leading folk music label [3 CDs] - 2018
- FECD283 Rick Kemp - Perfect Blue 2018
- FECD284 Peter Bellamy - The Maritime Suite 2018 [Reissue of 1982 cassette + 5 bonus tracks]
- FECD285 Various Artists - Strings That Nimbly Leap: Fylde Guitars And Their Players
- FECD286 Jez Lowe - The Jez Lowe Fellside Collection [Reissue of 6 Jez Lowe Fellside albums + 9 bonus tracks] [5 CDs]

=== The Tradition Masters ===
- Johnny Collins: The Best of the Early Years (FTSR1) 1998
- Trip to Harrogate: Tunes & Songs From Joshua Jackson's Book, 1798 (various artists) (FTSR2) 1999
- Enlist for a Soldier: The Soldier in Song From the English Civil War to the Falklands (various artists) (FTSR3) 2002
- The Bold Navigators: The Story of England's Canals in Song (various artists) (FTSR4) 1999
- Seasons, Ceremonies & Rituals: The Calendar in Traditional Song (various artists) (FTSR5) 2002

=== Jazz albums on LAKE ===
- The Controversial Bruce Turner: That's the Blues, Dad (LACD49)
- The Great Revival: Traditional Jazz 1949–1958 (various artists) (LACD136)
- The Great Revival: Traditional Jazz 1949–1958 Vol. 4 (various artists) (LACD137)
- The Great Revival: Traditional Jazz 1949–1958 Vol. 5 (various artists) (LACD158)
- Bruce Turner Jump Band: Jumpin' for Joy (LACD159)
- Dutch Swing College Band: Vintage Vol. 1 1948–1949 (LACD177)
- Bruce Turner: The Jump Band Collection (LACD184)
- Ken Colyer's Jazzmen: New Orleans to London & Back to the Delta (LACD209)
- Chris Barber's Jazz Band: International Classic Concerts (LAVCD210D) (double album)
- T.J. Johnson: TJ Johnson Presents Bourbon Kick (LACD214)
- Alex Welsh and His Band: Echoes of Chicago (LACD215)
- Humphry Lyttelton & his Band: Blues in the Night (LACD216)
- Sims Wheen Vintage Jazz: Band High Spirits (LACD217)
- Acker Bilk & The Stan Tracey Big Brass: Blue Acker (LACD218)
- Chris Barber's Jazz Band: Best Yet! (LACD219)
- Chris Barber's Jazz Band: Jazz Sacred and Secular (LACD222)
- Ruby Braff with Alex Welsh & His Band: Ruby Braff with Alex Welsh & His Band (LACD223)
- Monty Sunshine's Jazz Band: A Jazz Club Session (LACD224)
- Harry Gold & His Pieces of Eight: Bouncing Back (LACD225)
- Spats Langham & Martin Litton: Lollipops (LACD226)
- Buck Clayton with Humphry Little & His Band: Le Vrai Buck Clayton (LACD227)
- Ken Colyer's Jazzmen & Skiffle Group: Ken Colyer 1956 (LACD241)
- Chris Barber's Jazz Band: Chris Barber 1956 (LACD246)
- The Traditional Jazz Clarinet Collection (various artists) (LACS2)
- The Traditional Jazz New Orleans Collection (various artists) (LACS4)

=== Themed albums ===
- Voices: English Traditional Songs (various artists) (FECD87)
- Rolling Down to Old Maui (various artists) (FECD140)
- A Celebration of English Traditional Songs and their Australian variants (various artists) (FECD176D, double album)
- A Celebration of English Traditional Songs and their American variants (various artists) (FECD190D, double album)
- Trip to Harrowgate (various artists) (FTSR2)
- Enlist for a Soldier (various artists) (FTSR3)
- The Bold Navigators (various artists) (FTSR4)
- Seasons, Ceremonies & Rituals (various artists) (FTSR5)

== See also ==
- List of record labels
