= Elbow Jane =

Elbow Jane are now a five-piece acoustic band from Merseyside in the United Kingdom. They signed to Fellside Records in 2009, and in 2011 released their second CD on the Fellside label entitled The Boldest Blood. A reviewer in R2 magazine described their music as “utterly infectious”" and called the band “one of the top acoustic acts in the country". A reviewer in Maverick magazine wrote that they have a "vibrant sound with soaring harmonies...a thinking man's band that seems to have plenty to say and that "the musical arrangements are at time magical.",

The band performs on bouzouki, mandolin, guitar, keyboards, percussion and vocals. They have played main stages at the Acoustic Festival of Great Britain, Shrewsbury Folk Festival,Broadstairs Folk Week, Fylde Folk Festival, and Warwick Folk Festival. Their music has appeared on BBC Radio 2's Mike Harding Show and the local BBC Radio stations BBC Radio MerseysideBBC Radio Ulster and BBC Radio Wales.

Artists in Elbow Jane are Kevin Byrne – vocals, piano and guitars, Chris Chesters – bass guitar, Colin Burgess – drums and percussion, Joseph Topping – vocals, mandolin, mandola and guitars, Richard Woods – vocals, guitars, mandolin and dulcimer.

They have released four albums to date. Two have been produced independently - Smile and England Stone, whilst the latest recordings of 3-Side Island and The Boldest Blood have been with the folk label Fellside Records.

== Discography ==
=== Albums ===
- Smile
- England Stone
- 3 Side Island
- The Boldest Blood
- One for the Road - Live
