= Len Skeat =

British jazz double-bassist (1937–2021)

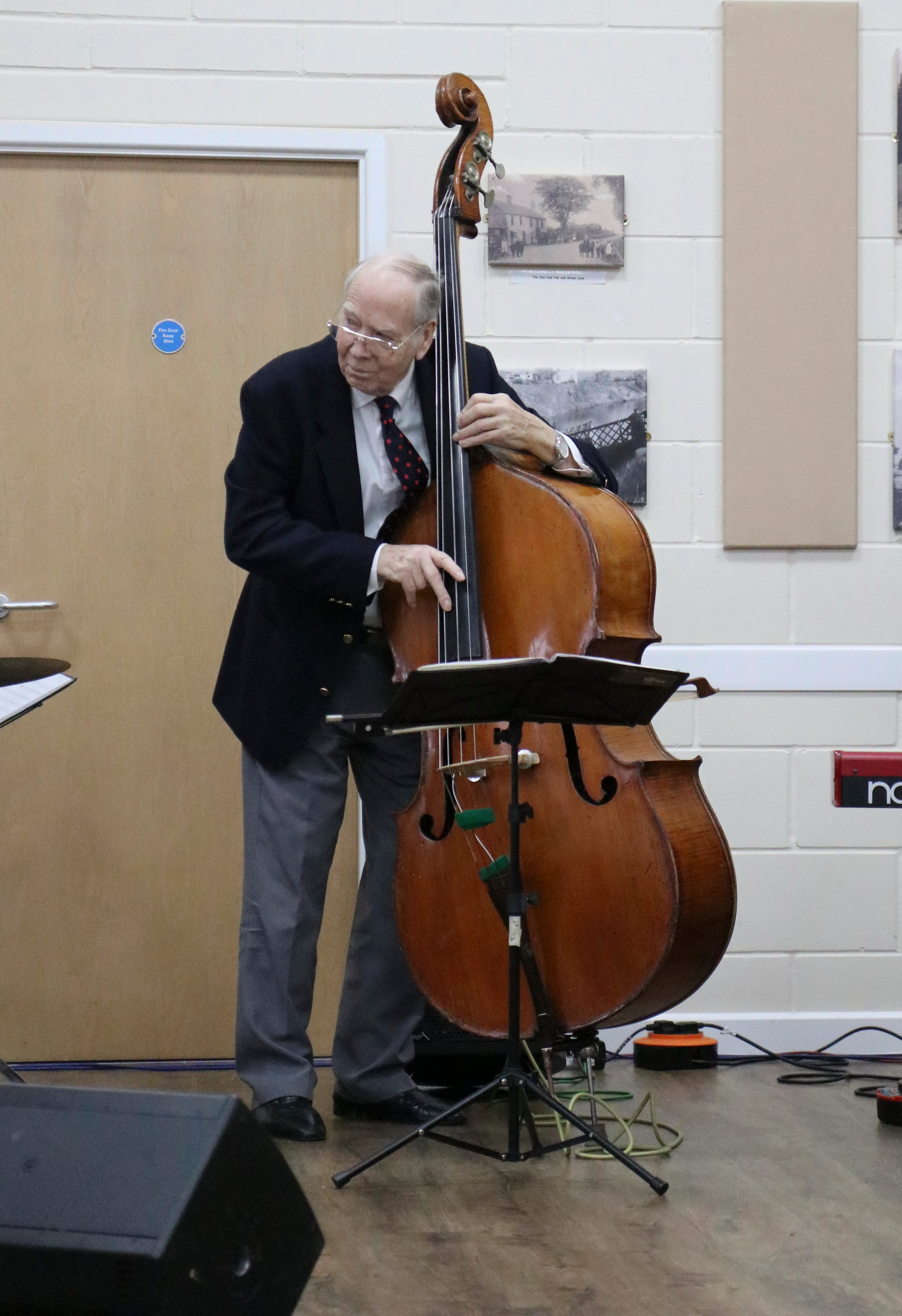
- Len Skeat at Upwell Jazz Club, 2020

Background information
- Born: Leonard Skeat; 9 February 1937; East London, England
- Died: 9 March 2021 (aged 84)
- Genres: Jazz
- Occupation: Musician
- Instrument: Double bass
- Years active: 1960s–2021

Leonard Skeat (9 February 1937 – 9 March 2021) was a British jazz double-bassist, and the younger brother of Bill Skeat, a saxophone player (1926–1999).

== Biography ==
He was born in East End of London, and worked with the Ted Heath band. During the 1970s, he was in demand and almost resident at the Pizza Express Jazz Club, and Pizza on the Park Jazz Club (closed 2010) in London. He was a member of the band, Velvet.

Skeat recorded with Mel Tormé, Ben Webster, Billy Eckstine, Lionel Hampton, Scott Hamilton, Helen Merrill, Lou Rawls, Harry Edison, Denny Wright, Digby Fairweather, Spike Robinson, Eddie Lockjaw Davis, Stéphane Grappelli, Dick Morrissey, Bill Watrous, Randy Sandke, and Russian Gregory Fine. He was also a member of the Eddie Thompson Trio and Charly Antolini's Jazz Power.

== Discography ==
With Charly Antolini

- 1989 Cookin' (L+R)
- 1990 Charly Antolini Meets Dick Morrissey
- 1993 Right-On (Bell)

With Bud Freeman

- 1980 The Dolphin Has A Message

With Spike Robinson

- 1984 Spike Robinson-Eddie Thompson Trip/At Chesters Volumes 1 & 2 (Hep)
- 1986 In Town with Elaine Delmar (Hep)
- 1987 The Gershwin Collection (Hep)

With Bill Watrous

- 1982 Bill Watrous in London

With Gregory Fine

- 1999 Gregory Fine Trio: «Happy Bluesday»
- 2000 Gregory Fine Trio: «Waltz For You»
- 2001 Gregory Fine Quartet: «Fine Plays Fine»
