= Kirsty McGee =

- Born: 1972 (age 53–54)
- Origin: Manchester, England
- Occupations: Singer-songwriter, musician
- Instruments: Vocals, guitar, Flute, Mandolin, Glockenspiel
- Years active: 1991–present
- Labels: Hobopop Recordings, Park Records, Fellside Records, Ugly Man Records
- Website: www.kirstymcgee.com

Kirsty McGee (born 1972) is an English singer-songwriter and guitarist from Manchester. She is well known within the British Folk scene although her music references Americana, Blues, Jazz and Rockabilly genres, and is influenced by the style of the Beatnik subculture. Her lyrics are typically deeply personal and introspective, and deal with a variety of subjects from politics to storytelling. She has worked with musicians such as Marc Ribot, Mike West, Danny Schmidt, Karine Polwart and Inge Thomson, and opened for Suzanne Vega, Eddi Reader and Capercaillie.

== Biography ==
McGee studied English Literature to master's degree level at the University of Sheffield. Her first commercially available recording was The Bedflowers' My Ex Lover's Address, included on Waaah! Records' Waaaaah! CD compilation in 1991. In this period McGee also wrote and sang with UK bands Mrs Kipling and Slumber. Slumber released Holly and IV EP in 1992 on Sunday Records, and Sleep EP in 1993 on the Vinyl Japan label. The Change EP from Mrs Kipling and was released in 1993 by Sunday Records.

During the 1990s, McGee was involved in environmental protests, including the campaign against Manchester Airport's second runway and the Newbury Bypass. She has also been a keen hitchhiker and has maintained an interest in alternative lifestyles which has influenced her writing style. She is a trained luthier and both she and Mat Martin have performed and recorded using instruments handmade by her.

In 2000, McGee won the Northwest songwriting competition organised by the Buskers' Ball and recorded her first release under her own name; Rock & Roll. The recording cemented her interest and reputation in the acoustic genre and led to her signing with Ugly Man Records. McGee recorded an album for Ugly Man entitled Little Things which was never released, although the title track and original artwork sketches by Peter Seal were included in the re-release of Honeysuckle in 2010.

McGee has worked in the studio with producers John Wood, Boo Hewerdine, Neill MacColl, Mike West and Mat Martin. In 2002 she signed to Fellside Records for her first full-length release, Honeysuckle. The album won her a nomination for Best Newcomer (2003) at the BBC Radio 2 Folk Awards in 2003. Her second album Frost, released by Park Records in 2004 followed this up with a nomination for Best Original Song ("Coffee Coloured Strings") in 2005.

McGee's third album Two Birds was released in 2006, also by Park Records, and was her last release before setting up her own Hobopop Recordings label in 2007. Two EPs followed: Sapho & Phao EP, a collection of settings of songs from John Lyly's play Sapho and Phao (1584); and Hobopop EP, which features early versions of songs later recorded for her fourth full studio album The Kansas Sessions (2008) along with cover versions of songs by Mike West and Kreg Viesselman.

The Kansas Sessions was recorded in West's studio in Lawrence, KS using local musicians during the winter of 2007, and released in 2008 by Hobopop Recordings. In the same year McGee and long-term collaborator Mat Martin formed the core of The Hobopop Collective, a group dedicated to performing McGee's songs in various formats (from duo to 10-piece band). The group was premiered at the 2008 Celtic Connections festival in Glasgow, opening for Capercaillie, and went on to perform McGee's material from 2008–2011 in collaboration with many guest artists including Karine Polwart, Inge Thomson and Christopher Cundy. The project was documented on the album No.5, a concert recorded at Manchester's Contact Theatre on 10 October 2009, and released by Hobopop Recordings in 2010. The album also featured an appearance from James Steel of The Brute Chorus, who McGee collaborated with again in 2010 on a split single, "Wife" / "Alligator Teeth".

McGee also re-released her debut album Honeysuckle in 2010 as a free download.

In January 2011, McGee was nominated for The 10th Annual Independent Music Awards under the Live Performance category for No.5. The album won its category in the public vote later that year.

McGee now performs in a variety of formats, from solo to band line-ups featuring members of the Hobopop Collective and other guests. Her sixth album, Contraband was released in 2012 and also features new collaborations with artists including Danny Schmidt, Carrie Elkin and Myshkin.

In 2013 her song "Sandman", originally featured on 2008's The Kansas Sessions was featured in the film Trance, directed by Danny Boyle, and was subsequently re-released by Hobopop Recordings as a single in April of that year. The song features in a love scene during the film, and a cover version by Rosario Dawson is featured on the film's OST. A motif from the song is also featured throughout Rick Smith's film score

On 5 October 2013, she performed at the "De Coninckplein" in Antwerp, Belgium.

== Discography ==
=== Solo albums and EPs ===
- Rock & Roll (Independent, 2000)
- Honeysuckle (Fellside, 2002)
- Frost (Park, 2004)
- Two Birds (Park, 2006)
- Sapho & Phao E.P. (Hobopop, 2007)
- Hobopop E.P. (Hobopop, 2007)
- The Kansas Sessions (Hobopop, 2008)
- No.5 [A Live Album] (Hobopop, 2010)
- Honeysuckle (Re-Issue) (Hobopop, 2010)
- Contraband (Hobopop, 2012)
- Those Old Demons (Hobopop, 2014) (as Kirsty McGee and The Hobopop Collective)
- Songs from the City & The Desert (Hobopop, 2016) (with Robert Garson as Ocotillo) Edition of 500
- Diamond Days EP (Hobopop, 2016) (as Kirsty McGee and The Hobopop Collective) Digital only
- The Italian Sessions EP / LP (Hobopop, 2019) (Limited edition of 50 LP / 60 EP)
- The Deafening Sound of Stars (Hobopop, 2019) (as Kirsty McGee and The Hobopop Collective)

=== Solo singles ===
- "Coffee Coloured Strings" (Park, 2004)
- "Sandman" (Hobopop, 2013)

=== Compilation albums ===
- Various Artists – The Waaaaah! CD (Waaah!,1991) (as Bedflowers)
- Various Artists – The Sound of Music EP (Waaah!, 1993) (as Mrs Kipling)
- Various Artists – Moving on Volume One: Sing Songs (Moving On, 2001)
- Various Artists – The BBC Folk Awards (Proper, 2005)
- Various Artists – Now Hear This! 68 (Word, 2008)
- Various Artists – Moonshine, Murder, Mountains & Mudflats (Thames Delta, 2008)
- Various Artists – Trance (OST) (UMC, 2013)

=== Guest appearances ===
- Quiet Loner – Secret Ruler Of The World (Circus 65, 2003)

=== Other projects ===
- Slumber – Holly and IV E.P. (Sunday Records, 1992)
- Slumber – Sleep E.P. (Vinyl Japan, 1993)
- Mrs. Kipling – Change E.P. (Sunday Records, 1993)
- All the Bees – All the Bees with Gitika Partington (All the Bees Records, 2023)
