= Pete Allen (musician) =

English jazz musician

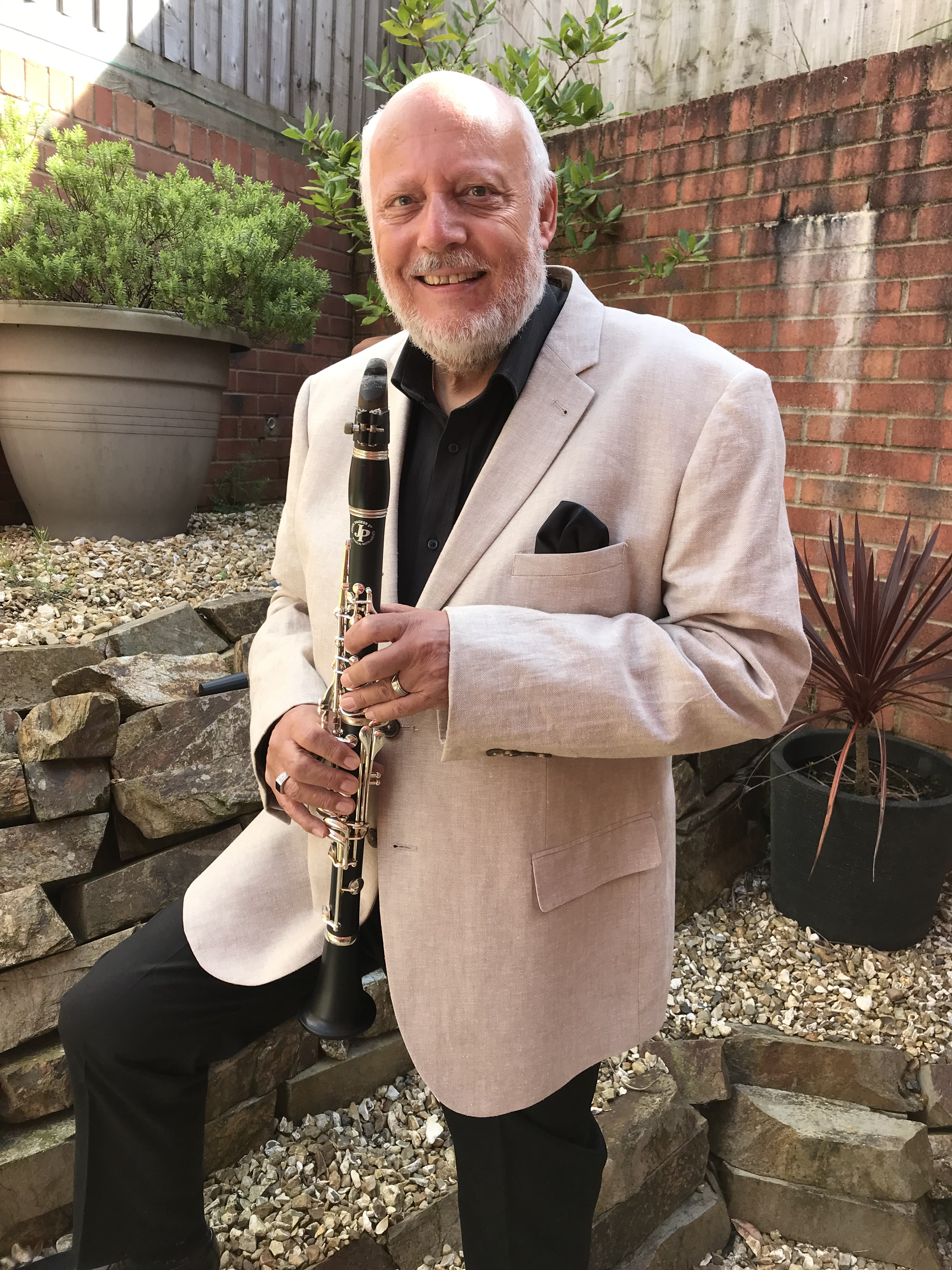
- Pete Allen in January 2026

Background information
- Born: 23 November 1954 (age 71); Newbury, Berkshire, England
- Genres: Dixieland jazz
- Occupation: Musician
- Instruments: Clarinet, saxophone, banjo
- Website: peteallenjazz.com

Pete Allen (born 23 November 1954) is an English Dixieland jazz clarinettist, alto and soprano saxophonist, banjo, bandleader, and vocalist. He has appeared in television and radio shows, both with his band and as a solo act. He has worked with Peanuts Hucko, Bud Freeman, Bob Wilber, Marty Grosz, Billy Butterfield, Barrett Deems, Jack Lesberg, and Kenny Ball.

== Biography ==
=== Early life ===
The only child of Bernard and June Allen, Pete Allen was born in Newbury, Berkshire, England, educated at Winchcombe primary and junior schools, then Downs School at Compton. At Downs he was taught music by Don Paxton, who gave him a grounding in classical music.

=== Career ===
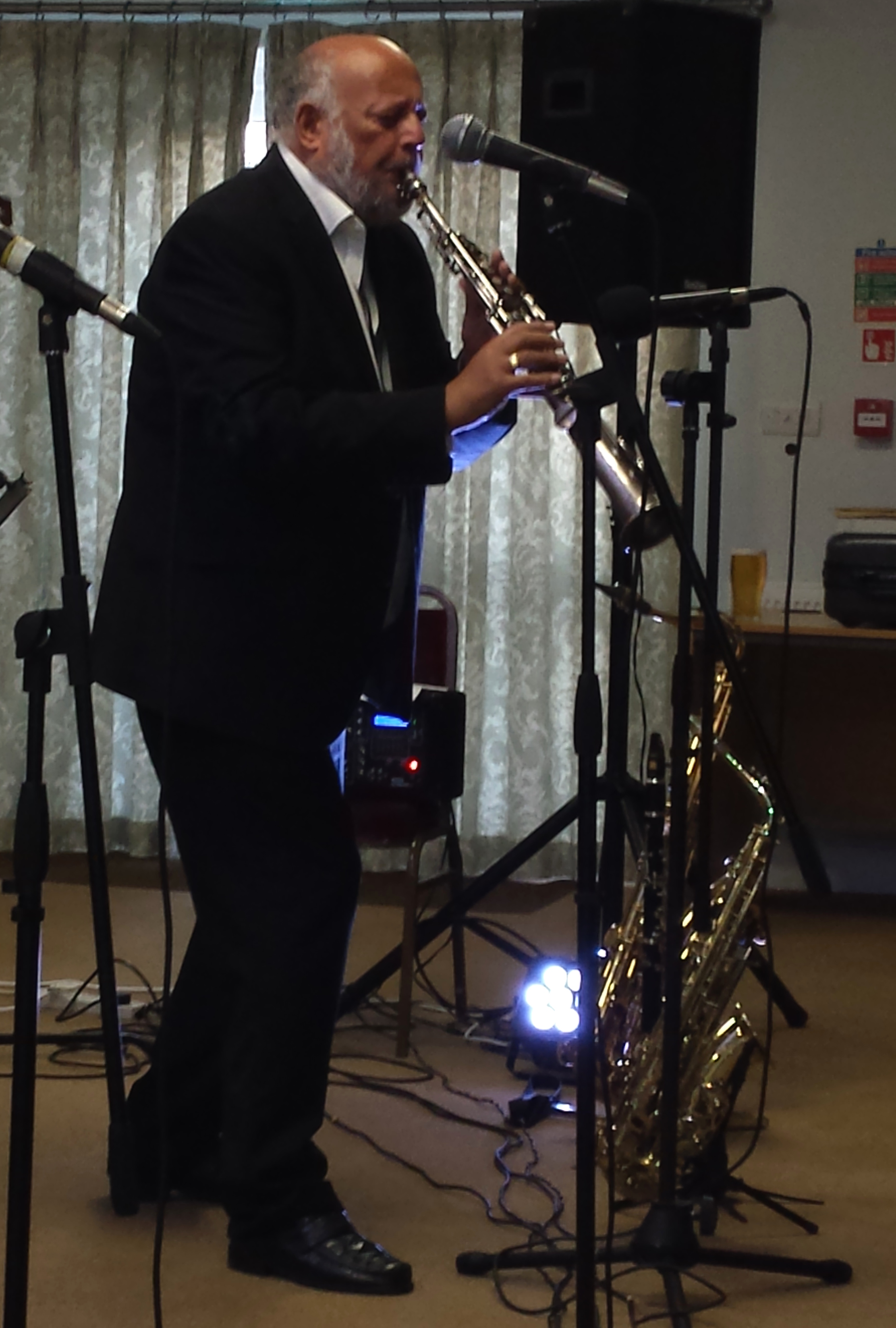
Pete Allen Newbury Feb 2020

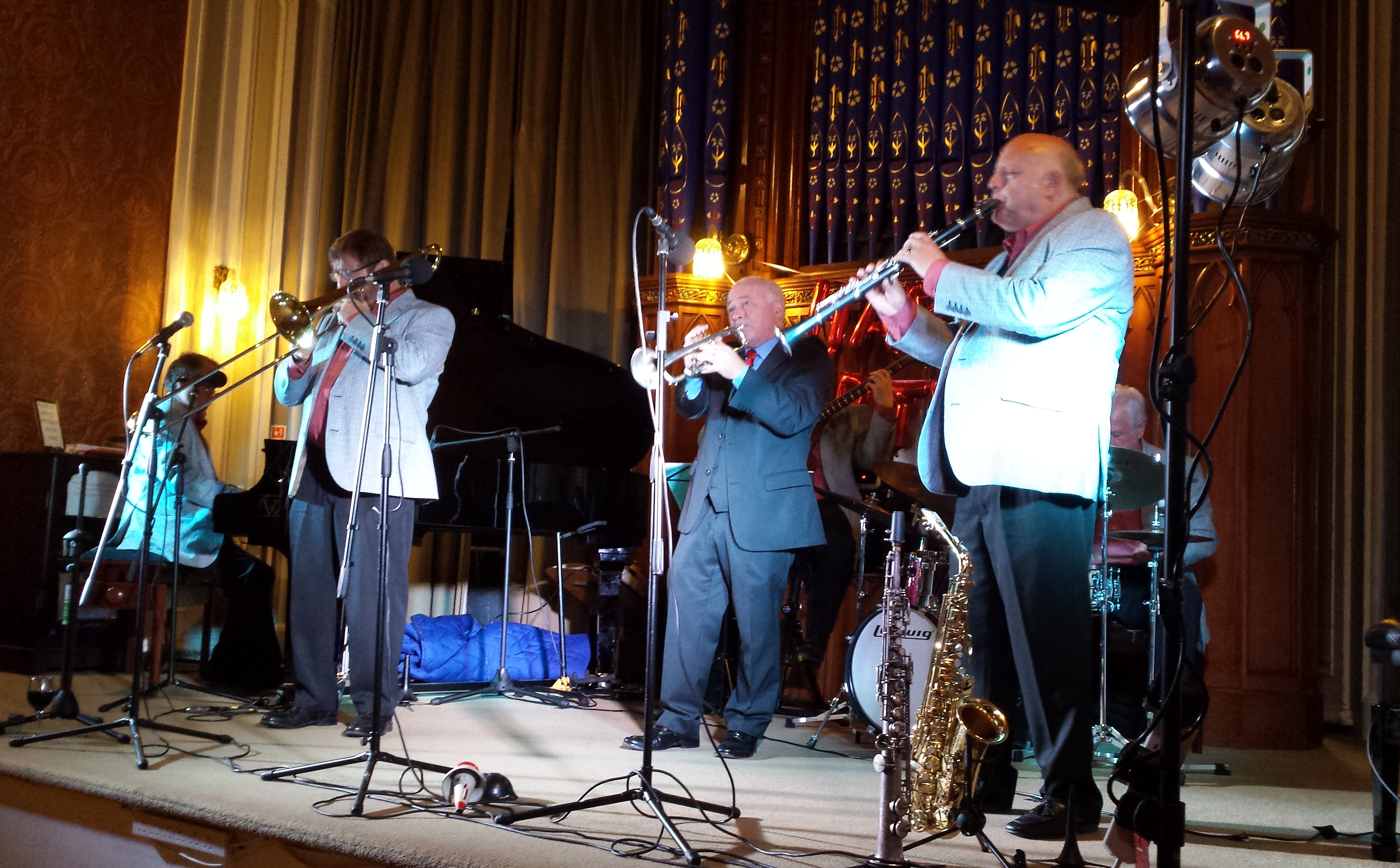
Pete Allen Jazz Band, Sidmouth, November 2019

Allen became interested in music while at school when he started to play clarinet with his father's band. Bernie Allen had formed a trio with organ, drums and himself on banjo, known as Pete Giles and his Merry Men. After a brief career as a P.C. in Thames Valley Police Force, Allen joined Rod Mason's Jazz Band in 1976. The band's line-up was Rod Mason (trumpet), Chris Haskins (bass), Jimmy Garforth (drums), Johnny Withers (banjo), Pete Allen (clarinet and saxophone) and Roger Marks (trombone).

Allen formed his band in October 1978 with Janusz Carmello (trumpet), John Armatage (drums), Campbell Burnap (trombone), Bernie Allen (banjo) and Tony Bagot (bass). During the early years the band made thirty appearances on Pebble Mill at One for BBC Television.

In 1983, the Pete Allen Jazz Band made the first of several trips to the Old Sacramento Dixieland Jazz Jubilee in California. Their first concert was played to a 4,500 audience with Chris Hodgkins (trumpet), Ian Bateman (trombone), Tony Bagot (bass) and Graham Scriven (drums). In 1984 Allen was invited to lead the Worldwide All Stars with Jack Lesberg (bass) and Barrett Deems (drums), who had both played with Louis Armstrong's All Stars.

In 1992, Allen organized a trip to New Orleans with British musicians. He was invited to meet the city mayor and was awarded an Honorary Citizenship of New Orleans for services to British music and tourism.

During the late 1980s and 1990s, a show "Jazzin' Around" was played in UK theatres, which included Tommy Burton, Beryl Bryden, Joan Savage, Don Lusher, Clinton Ford and George Chisholm.

The Pete Allen Jazz Band (usually six or seven musicians) and his Dukes of Wellington (normally four or five) has appeared at jazz festivals, theatres and clubs throughout the UK and in France, Denmark, Germany, Holland, Portugal and Spain.

During November 2019, Allen celebrated his 65th birthday with a weekend program of Jazz at the Sidholme Hotel, Sidmouth. Guests included Enrico Tomasso (trumpet) and Tad Newton's Jazz Friends.

=== Current work ===
As a result of the COVID-19 pandemic, all live appearances were cancelled from March 2020. Following relaxation of Covid-19 rules, live performances started up again from July 2022 with band line-up consisting of Roger Marks (trombone), Chris Hodgskins (trumpet), Dave Hanratty (bass), James Clemas (piano), Jim Newton (drums) and is led by Allen (clarinet, saxophones, banjo and vocals.

Following band personnel changes during 2025, the band expanded to eight regular musicians: Max Brittain (banjo/guitar), Jim Newton (drums), Roger Marks (trombone), Trevor Whiting (clarinet/saxes), Chris Hodgkins (trumpet), Andrew Clancy (piano) and Andy Crowdy (double bass), led by Allen (clarinet, saxophones, banjo and vocals).

Allen published On the Beat: My Life as a Jazz Musician.

== Discography ==
- Turkey Trot (Black Lion, 1979)
- Down in Honkey Tonk (Black Lion, 1979)
- While We Danced at the Mardi Gras (Jazz Dub, 1980)
- The Martinique (A.R.B., 1983)
- Sacramento Lift Off (Platform/Pausa, 1983)
- Jazzin' Around (A.R.B., 1984)
- Jazzin' Around II (A.R.B., 1984)
- Dixie Date (Black Lion, 1986)
- One for the Road (P.A.R., 1987)
- Wild Cat Blues (P.A.R., 1988)
- St. Phillips Streat Breakdown (P.A.R., 1988)
- 21 Years On (Loose Tie, 2001)
- Running Wild (Upbeat Jazz, 2002)
- Chinatown My Chinatown (Raymer Sound, 2004)
- Your Requests (Raymer Sound, 2008)
- Amapola (Raymer Sound, 2011)
- The Jazzalikes - "Something Different" - Pete Allen and Dave Browning (Raymer Sound, 2012)
- I Wish You Love - Dukes of Wellington (Upbeat, 2018)
- On the Beat (Upbeat, 2019)
- New Orleans Wiggle - Jazz Magic (UpbeatJazz 2025)
