= Anton Kwiatkowski =

- Genre: Classical
- Occupation: Producer/Audio Engineer
- Years active: 1969–present
- Labels: EMI, Analekta, Angel Records, ASV, BIS, Chandos, Fanfare, Hungaroton, Hyperion, IBS, IMP, Marquis, Opening Day Entertainment, Pro Arte, RCA, Sony Classical, Summit, Unicorn-Kanchana

Anton Kwiatkowski is a Canadian recording engineer and record producer who began his career in England.

== Beginnings in England: 1969–1977 ==
From 1969 to 1977, Kwiatkowski worked as producer/engineer for EMI in London, England, recording with the London Philharmonic, London Symphony, Royal Philharmonic, New Philharmonia, English Chamber, Hallé and Scottish National Orchestras. Many of the productions during this time, including several popular music productions, were recorded at EMI's Abbey Road Studios. The 1970s also saw regular collaborations with Jazz guitarist Denny Wright for EMI's Music for Pleasure record label.

== Work in Canada: CBC 1977–1999 ==
In 1977, Kwiatkowski was invited to come to Canada to upgrade the recording quality of the Canadian Broadcasting Corporation's in-house record label, where he eventually spent over two decades as a Senior Recording Producer. The CBC's SM5000 label, featuring artists from across Canada, was launched in 1981 to showcase his new recordings, which met with immediate critical success. Since arriving in Canada, Kwiatkowski has worked with the Toronto Symphony Orchestra, the National Arts Centre Orchestra, and the Edmonton Symphony Orchestra. Among music industry experts and critics, he is widely considered to be one of Canada's leading recording engineers and producers, with Wholenote Magazine calling him "a celebrity tonmeister". In particular, Kwiatkowski receives praise for his sophisticated microphone techniques, his attention to details of sound, his ability to capture the intricacies of individual instruments, and his intuition in identifying superior sounding acoustic spaces. His role in the final quality of productions is acknowledged regularly in ways similar to Flegler:

For quality of sound and soundness of quality-control this ... is in a class with ... industry-standard-setting productions. I usually don't pay much attention to producers of records in my reviews but since the liner notes of this ... (and others in this "SM5000 Series") credit producer Anton Kwiatkowski's "award-winning" microphone techniques, and the results are so unfailingly excellent as to be thoroughly identifiable with his work, his name deserves mention.

== Freelance Work: 1981–present ==
Kwiatkowski currently works as a freelance producer/engineer and as such has recorded for Analekta, Angel Records (EMI), ASV, BIS, Chandos, EBS, Fanfare, Hungaroton, Hyperion, IBS, IMP, Marquis, Opening Day Entertainment, Pro Arte, RCA, Sefel Records, Sony Classical, Summit and Unicorn-Kanchana. Popple again:

Kwiatkowski is unquestionably a Canadian recording-engineer star. Kwiatkowski's recordings of John Arpin were released on four labels: Fanfare, Intersound, Sony and Marquis. A later partnership between John and Anton, called Johnathon Productions (their names combined, an Arpin idea), was formed to license material to record labels.

Based in Toronto, Kwiatkowski provides remote and in-house studio recording as well as digital editing and mastering services. He also accommodates audition sessions and re-mastering of older material. Kwiatkowski has received two Juno Award nominations for "Recording Engineer of the Year" in 1985 and 1986.

== Discography ==
A comprehensive Kwiatkowski discography listing over 900 titles spanning nearly half a century of recording and production work is available on Allmusic.

== Awards ==
- 6 East Coast Music Awards
- 1 Indie Award
- 21 Juno Awards
- 100 Juno Nominations
