= Dave Goulder =

English singer and guitarist (born 1939)

- Born: 29 June 1939 (age 87); Nottingham, England
- Genres: Folk
- Occupation: Singer-songwriter
- Instrument: Guitar
- Years active: 1961–present
- Labels: Fellside Records; Outer Green Records; Timberhead Music; Argo
- Website: http://www.davegoulder.co.uk

(John) David Goulder, BEM (born 29 June 1939) is an English singer, guitarist, dry stone wall builder, mountain climber, railway fireman, humorist, and composer. He is best known for his song "January Man" and for his collections of railway songs which have received acclaim by critics and enthusiasts alike.. He was awarded the British Empire Medal in the New Years Honours 2025 for services to Dry Stone Walling and to the community of Rosehall, Sutherland.

== Family and personal life ==
Goulder is married to his wife Mary and lives in Rosehall in the Scottish Highlands.

== Musical career ==
=== Early work ===
Dave Goulder left the railway in 1961 and began mountaineering while recording his first folk records in the late 1960s progressing in time to collections of railway songs.

== Selected discography ==
Release date	Album title	Record label
1975	The Golden Days of Steam	Argo
1974	Stone, Steam and Starlings	Argo
1973	The Man Who Put The Engine in the Chip Shop	Argo
1971	The Raven & The Crow	Argo
1971	Requiem for Steam	Argo Big Ben Record
1970	January Man	Argo
1969	LP	Argo

== Quotes ==
=== From Goulder ===
- "[The jaw harp] is particularly well suited to Scottish music; the drone effect being perfect for pipe marches in any time signature, in fact just about all bagpipe tunes will richly reward the player."
