= Patti Reid =

Patti Reid is an English folk singer from Penrith, Cumbria, England. She released an eponymous album on Fellside Records in 1987 and has appeared on several compilation albums featuring English folk singers. She released another album, Pink Sand in 2002. She has sung at many British folk festivals, and acted on stage on occasion, including a production of Death and the Maiden.
