= 77 Records =

British record company and label

- Founded: 1957
- Founder: Doug Dobell
- Genre: Folk, blues, jazz
- Country of origin: UK

77 Records was a British record company and label established in 1957 by Doug Dobell, the proprietor of 'Dobell's Jazz Record Shop' at 77 Charing Cross Road, London. The label specialised in folk, blues, and jazz.

Several British jazz musicians, such as Acker Bilk, Bruce Turner, Tubby Hayes, Les Condon, Dick Morrissey, Brian Lemon and Buck Clayton, recorded on the label in the mid-1960s.

British rhythm and blues performers such as Alexis Korner also recorded for 77 Records, as did many American artists. 77 Records distributed the releases of US labels, including recordings by Ramblin' Jack Elliott, Lightnin' Hopkins, Scrapper Blackwell, Reverend Gary Davis, Robert Pete Williams, Big Joe Williams, Sunnyland Slim, Joe Turner, Little Brother Montgomery, Yank Rachell, and Sleepy John Estes.

In 1960, Dobell started a short-lived spin-off label, Folklore, which released albums by Steve Benbow, Dominic Behan, Dick Fariña and Eric Von Schmidt, and Cyril Davies and Alexis Korner, amongst others. A 1963 album by Dick Fariña and Eric Von Schmidt, released on Folklore, featured "Blind Boy Grunt", alias Bob Dylan, on harmonica. The label also reissued recordings licensed from independent American record labels such as Arhoolie.

== See also ==
- Lists of record labels
