= Cookin' (Charly Antolini and Dick Morrissey album) =

Cookin’

Live album by Charly Antolini and Dick Morrissey
- Released: 1989
- Recorded: Germany, 14 April 1989
- Genre: Jazz
- Label: Bellaphon

Charly Antolini and Dick Morrissey chronology
Cookin’ (1989)	Charly Antolini Meets Dick Morrissey (1990)

Cookin’ is the first of three live albums by Swiss drummer Charly Antolini and UK saxophonist Dick Morrissey containing mainly jazz and pop standards. The album was recorded live in Germany in 1989.

== Track listing ==
1. "After You've Gone" (Turner Layton, Henry Creamer)
2. "My Romance" (Richard Rodgers, Lorenz Hart)
3. "Jumpin' at the Woodside" (Count Basie)
4. "My Ship" (Kurt Weill, Ira Gershwin)
5. "Yesterdays" (Otto Harbach, Jerome Kern)
6. "Dick's Blues" (Dick Morrissey)
7. "Soon" (George Gershwin, Ira Gershwin)
8. "Tickle Toe" (Louis Hirsch)
9. "Like Someone in Love" (Jimmy Van Heusen, Johnny Burke)
10. "Perdido" (Juan Tizol)
11. "Lady Be Good" (George Gershwin, Ira Gershwin)

== Personnel ==
- Charly Antolini - drums
- Dick Morrissey - tenor saxophone
- Brian Lemon - piano
- Len Skeat - bass
