= Charly Antolini Meets Dick Morrissey =

Live album by Charly Antolini and Dick Morrissey
- Released: 1992
- Recorded: 5 December 1990
- Genre: Jazz
- Label: Bell BLR 84045

Charly Antolini and Dick Morrissey chronology
Cookin' (1989)	Charly Antolini Meets Dick Morrissey (1992)	Right-On (1993)

Charly Antolini Meets Dick Morrissey is the second album recorded by Swiss drummer Charly Antolini and British tenor sax player Dick Morrissey. The tracks are jazz and standards repertoire and were recorded live at Pizza Express' Pizza on the Park, London on 5 December 1990.

== Track listing ==
1. "Secret Love" (Sammy Fain, Paul Francis Webster)
2. "Too Close for Comfort" (Jerry Bock, George David Weiss, Larry Holofcener)
3. "It Never Entered My Mind" (Richard Rodgers, Lorenz Hart)
4. "There Will Never Be Another You" (Harry Warren, Mack Gordon)
5. "You Stepped Out of a Dream" (Nacio Herb Brown, Gus Kahn)
6. "Just Squeeze Me (But Please Don't Tease Me)" (Duke Ellington, Lee Gaines)
7. "Darn That Dream" (Jimmy Van Heusen, Eddie DeLange)
8. "C-Jam Blues" (Duke Ellington)

== Personnel ==
- Charly Antolini - drums
- Dick Morrissey - tenor saxophone
- Brian Lemon - piano
- Len Skeat - bass
