= Richard Pite =

British musician

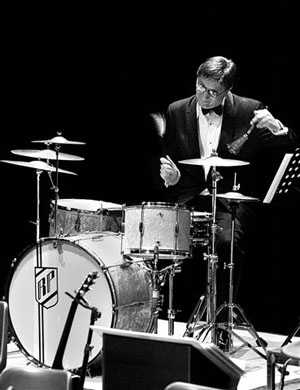
Jazz Drummer and Vintage / Classic Jazz Historian Concert Producer, Richard Pite.

Richard Pite is a British professional musician (drums, double bass, bass ukulele, tuba and sousaphone) and jazz historian specialising in the jazz of the early-20th century. He is the founder of two music companies: PartyJazz and The Jazz Repertory Company, and is also the Director of Music for Boisdale, which presents jazz and other live music on a nightly basis at its four London venues. For many years he specialised in 1920s music and the drum techniques and visual tricks of the era's jazz drummers and over the last 12 years has worked together with musical partner Pete Long, to preserve jazz history through live performance. Together they have recreated historic moments from jazz in association with The National Jazz Archive. For the 100th anniversary of Gene Krupa's birth in 2009, Pite staged the only concert in Britain celebrating his life and work, as he was one of the most important and flamboyant drummers in jazz history.

== Early career ==
A graduate of York University, Pite began his professional career in California in 1980 where he worked as a freelance drummer. In 1981 he returned to London and freelanced in jazz, rock and country music. He joined the Carey Duncan Band in the summer of 1981 and spent two years touring Europe and the United States with this Country Rock combo. He was concurrently working with a 1920s jazz band called The Rio Trio which, in 1982, became the resident band on BBC Radio 4's weekly show And So To Ned, hosted by Ned Sherrin. In 1983 he joined The Ross Mitchell Band – the last band to be resident at the London dance venue, the Hammersmith Palais. The band played for international ballroom dancing championships and released several albums of "strict tempo" music. In 1986 he took over the management of The Rio Trio, a position he held for 10 years. After two tours of the US in 1995 and 1996 the band split up.

== Jazz Repertory Company ==
Pite is the founder, producer and musical director of The Jazz Repertory Company – the only organisation in the UK dedicated solely to producing concerts highlighting the significant musicians, styles and events in jazz history. Diligently researched and using specialist musicians, the productions aim to recreate jazz history as authentically as possible either in overviews such as the popular 100 Years of Jazz in 99 minutes or specific events such as Louis Armstrong and Duke Ellington appearing for the first time in London in 1932 and 1933 or Benny Goodman’s Famous 1938 Carnegie Hall Jazz Concert.

The Jazz Repertory Company concerts take place at London’s Cadogan Hall and the first concert staged there was in 2008. This concert recreated the music Artie Shaw recorded with big band and strings in the years 1937 to 1939 and the music had never been presented live in the UK up until this time. Much of the music presented by the Jazz Repertory Company had been popular in its day but was now in danger of sinking into obscurity. An example of this was the music of Raymond Scott which formed part of the programme of 2009’s Chamber Jazz. Scott’s Quintette racked up numerous big-selling discs and he later ended up selling his back catalogue to Warner Brothers who took the music and utilised it in many of their Looney Tunes cartoons. Scott’s Powerhouse was used nine times by Warner Brothers and recently was recycled in an episode of The Simpsons.

Another example of a, now largely forgotten, mass entertainment phenomenon being recently revived by the JRC is the music of Paul Whiteman – the leading bandleader of 1920s America. A million selling artist who is now largely remembered for commissioning George Gershwin to write Rhapsody In Blue in 1924 and employing one of the first great names in jazz history – Bix Beiderbecke. Other jazz musicians and stars of popular music celebrated in Jazz Repertory Concerts range from The Andrews Sisters and Glenn Miller to Dizzy Gillespie and Charlie Parker and from Sidney Bechet and Fats Waller through to Weather Report and Herbie Hancock.

=== Concerts ===
- Keith Nichols Presents... (1987)
- Benny Goodman's Famous 1938 Carnegie Hall Concert (2007)
- London Omnibus (2008)
- Artie Shaw With Strings (2008)
- Gene Krupa Centenary Concert (2009)
- Chamber Jazz (2009)
- The Blagger's Guide To Jazz Live (2010)
- 100 Years of Jazz in 99 Minutes (2010)
- After You've Gone (2010)
- The Vocal Groups (2010)
- Louis & The Duke In London (2013)
- Peggy, Duke & Benny (2013)
- Benny Goodman & Glenn Miller at Carnegie Hall 1939 (2014)
- The Newport Jazz Festival: 1950s (2014)
- 100 Years of Big Band Jazz in 99 Minutes (2014)
- Jazz at The Philharmonic - a 70th Anniversary Tribute (2014)
- Berlin To Bacharach (2015)
- Ray Charles & Nina Simone: The Genius Of (2015)
- Jazz In New York: The 1930s (2015)
- Paul Whiteman: The King Of Jazz (2015)
- A Complete and Utter History of Jazz (Without the Boring Bits) (2016)
- 1956: A Jazz Jubilee (2016)
- Jazz in New York: Part 2: The 1930s and 40s: From Swing to Be-Bop (2017)
- The Golden Age of British Big Bands (2017)
- Jazz at Carnegie Hall (2017)
- 1957: A Jazz Jukebox (2017)

== Party Jazz Agency ==
In 1987 Pite founded the live music agency Party Jazz. It specialises in jazz, blues, soul and funk music for all kinds of events and venues including festivals and theatres, corporate and private clients, weddings, parties, product and marketing launches and for television, film and radio. Party Jazz is responsible for launching and nurturing such bands as The Rio Trio, Royal Hen, Soul Shadows and The Hush Puppies and for supporting talent such as Eric Ranzoni, Reuben Richards, Liz Fletcher and Cousin Alice.

== Boisdale Jazz Clubs ==
In 1999 Pite became Director of Music for Boisdale PLC, booking live entertainment for The Boisdale Jazz and Cigar Club in Belgravia London. Boisdale of Bishopsgate followed in 2002 and in 2011 he added Boisdale of Canary Wharf to his roster. As director of Music he has booked acts such as Acker Bilk, Kenny Ball, Paul Jones, Georgie Fame, Hot Chocolate, Chucho Valdez, Mud Morganfield, Ray Gelato, Midge Ure, the Humphrey Lyttelton Band, Chris Barber, Liane Carroll, Buddy Whittington and The Foundations. He has also been a dedicated supporter of new and emerging talent such as Philip Achille, Vimala Rowe, Orli Nyles, Heather Simmons and Lee Gold as well as helping Manchester's Jeremy Sassoon establish himself in London.

== Professional musician and bandleader ==
Since the age of 18 Pite has worked as a professional drummer and he is also proficient on double bass, tuba/sousaphone and assorted percussion instruments. At the start of his career Pite specialised in Vintage and Classic Jazz from the 1920s to the 1950s. He has specialised in this genre ever since and performed regularly with internationally acclaimed artists such as Keith Nichols and The Blue Devils, The Pasadena Roof Orchestra and for 10 years he performed with The Rio Trio (1986-1996).

Pite frequently performs at Boisdale Belgravia and Canary Wharf on drums and bass, as well as acting as bandleader and sideman in numerous jazz bands (mainly vintage and mainstream). His personal musical projects include Soul Shadows (playing the music of the jazz-funk pioneers The Crusaders), The Hush Puppies - a band dedicated to playing soul funk and pop with minimal amplification and London Omnibus - a trio performing jazz and popular music of the 1920s and 1930s alongside comedy and vaudeville routines.

== In the media ==
Pite has often been featured in the media both as a guest expert and an artist including the Claire Teal show on BBC Radio 2, as well as his own radio show on 40s UK Radio and local radio stations. He was guest expert on five one hour long episodes of Jazz Library for BBC Radio 3. His broadcast work includes adverts for Lexus (with Kylie Minogue) and McDonald's for the 2014 World Cup campaign. Films include Harry Potter, Me and Orson Welles and I Capture The Castle. He has been interviewed by many print and online magazines including Blues Matters, and London Jazz News. His concerts have been lauded in many media sources including The Daily Telegraph and The Evening Standard.

== Selected discography ==
- 1982 : Carey Duncan Live
- 1984 : The Ross Mitchell Band
- 1985 : Let’s Teach The World To Dance : The Ross Mitchell Band
- 1991 : Syncopated Jamboree : Keith Nichols and The Cotton Club Orchestra
- 1994 : Henderson Stomp : Keith Nichols and The Cotton Club Orchestra
- 1994 : The Rio Trio
- 1997 : Harlem’s Arabian Nights : Keith Nichols and the Cotton Club Orchestra
- 1997 : The Cotton Club Band
- 1999 : Cotton Club Stomp : The Cotton Club Orchestra
- 2000 : From Ragtime To Swing: Live at The Royal Albert Hall
- 2002 : Boisdale Blue Rhythm Band Live Vol 1.
- 2003 : Kansas City Breakdown : Keith Nichols and the Blue Devils
- 2003 : Keith Nichols and The Blue Devils
- 2004 : Boisdale Blue Rhythm Band Live Volume 2. Blues from Deepest Belgravia
- 2004 : Percolatin’ Blues : The Chalumeau Serenaders
- 2005 : Top Cat : Richard Shelton
- 2005 : The Charmful Little Armful : Keith Nichols’ Little Devils
- 2007 : You Can’t Do That : Boisdale Blue Rhythm Band
- 2007 : Shoobiz: Shoo Shoo Baby
- 2007 : Peter Long: Music for 4,5 and 6
- 2009 : London Omnibus
- 2013 : Peggy, Duke and Benny : Georgina Jackson and The Pete Long Quartet
- 2013 : Now We Are 57 : Richard Pite Quartet
- 2014 : Benny Goodman and Glenn Miller at Carnegie Hall 1939 : The Goodman-Miller Tribute Orchestra
- 2014 : A Tribute to Jazz At The Philharmonic
- 2014 : The Tattooed Bride: Echoes of Ellington
