= Campbell Burnap =

English trombonist, vocalist and broadcaster

- Born: Campbell Crichton Mackinnon Burnap; 10 September 1939; Derby, England
- Died: 30 May 2008 (aged 68)
- Genres: Jazz
- Occupations: Musician; Vocalist; Broadcaster
- Years active: 1958–2008

Campbell Crichton Mackinnon Burnap (10 September 1939 – 30 May 2008) was an English jazz trombonist, vocalist and broadcaster.

== Early life ==
Born in Derby, England, Burnap became interested in New Orleans jazz while attending school in Belper. He built up a friendship with the clarinet player Chris Blount, who introduced him to New Orleans veterans Bunk Johnson and George Lewis. Burnap played washboard in the skiffle group formed by Blount along with his classmates as a teenager in England.

== Career ==
In 1958, aged 19, he moved to New Zealand where he began playing trombone and played in the Omega Jazz Band. He continued to record with them for three years until 1961. From 1962 to 1965 he played in Australia with the Hot Sands Jazz Band (1962–64) and Geoff Bull's Olympia Jazz Band (1964–65). In 1965 he played for a time at Preservation Hall in New Orleans, then returned briefly to the UK, playing with Terry Lightfoot and Monty Sunshine. He spent three further years (1966–69) in Australia before moving permanently back to the UK, settling in London. He played with Ian Armit (1969–70), Alan Elsdon (1970–75), Alex Welsh (1978–79), and Acker Bilk (1980–87). He played with a considerable number of well-known New Orleans/mainstream bands in England, and also appeared with visiting American jazz musicians including Billy Butterfield, Bud Freeman, Bob Haggart, and Kenny Davern. In 1988, Burnap also broadcast regularly as a jazz presenter with London's Jazz FM and BBC Radio 2, where he was also heard as a panellist on the quiz-show Jazz Score.

He has also written on jazz topics. His short story called "A Bit of a Scrape" was included in the Quartet Books 1986 collection called B-Flat, Bebop, Scat. He has penned reviews for jazz magazines as well as writing and presenting a number of radio features, including a highly acclaimed series on the life and music of Louis Armstrong. He also presented the request programme Jazz for the Asking on the BBC World Service.

His playing and singing style was heavily influenced by Jack Teagarden. In 1996, when he was 57, he travelled to China where he delivered a successful lecture on jazz to an audience of students in Beijing.

== Personal life ==
Burnap was a cricket fan and member of Derbyshire County Cricket Club for over 20 years, being a close friend of Derbyshire player Geoff Miller, who was the national selector for the England cricket team. He wore an MCC tie as he led a band called 'The Out-Swingers' behind the pavilion at Lord's, which serenaded the crowd during the lunch interval at Test matches. He died from pancreatic cancer in May 2008 and his ashes were scattered at Lord's. He is survived by his wife Jenny and stepchildren Janie and Carl.
