= Lizzie Nunnery =

Singer

Lizzie Nunnery (born 1982, Liverpool) is an English playwright and singer-songwriter. She has participated in the Future Perfect scheme for new playwrights run by Paines Plough.

Co-Artistic Director of Almanac Arts, Lizzie’s first play Intemperance (Liverpool Everyman 2007) was set among Liverpool’s Irish-Scandinavian underclass. It was awarded five stars by the Guardian and shortlisted for the Meyer-Whitworth Award. She co-wrote Unprotected, winner of the Amnesty International Award for Freedom of Expression (Everyman/Traverse Edinburgh). The Swallowing Dark (Liverpool Playhouse Studio, Theatre503, Inis Nua Theatre Philadelphia USA), was shortlisted for the Susan Smith Blackburn Award.

Her work also includes Narvik (Box of Tricks UK tour 2017, Nordland Theatre Norwegian tour 2019), a play with songs dealing with the Narvik campaign and the Arctic convoys of World War II. Narvik won Best New Play at the UK Theatre Awards 2017.

Other recent work includes play with songs The Sum (Everyman), The People Are Singing (Royal Exchange Studio, Manchester), The Snow Dragons (National Theatre), and poetry and music piece Horny Handed Tons of Soil (Unity Theatre/Phrased & Confused UK tour 2018). She has written extensively for BBC radio and is also a poet and prose writer. Her original feature film With Love is in development with Blue Horizon Productions.

Her first album, Company of Ghosts was released on Fellside Records in 2010. (Fellside Records, 2010).

As a duo with Norheim she has released an album Black Hound Howling and two EPs: Songs of Drink and Revolution and Narvik EP featuring songs from the acclaimed show. All releases are available from nunnerynorheim.com
