= Denny Wright =

English jazz guitarist (1924–1992)

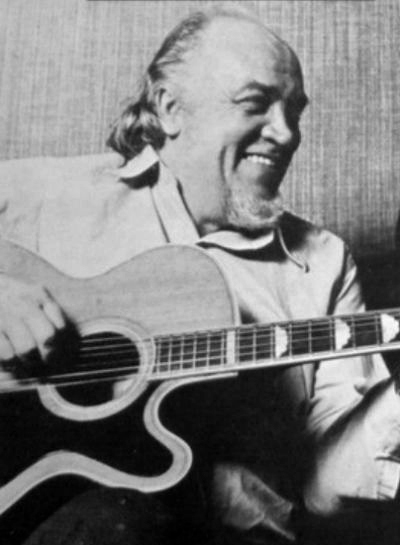

Background information
- Born: Denys Justin Wright; 6 May 1924; Bromley, Kent, England
- Died: 8 February 1992 (aged 67) London, England
- Genres: Jazz, classical
- Occupation: Musician
- Instrument: Guitar
- Years active: 1939–1991
- Label: Decca

Denys Justin Wright (6 May 1924 – 8 February 1992), known professionally as Denny Wright, was a British jazz guitarist.

A session musician for many years, Wright frequently acted as arranger and "fixer" for recording sessions. He was a prolific jazz and orchestra composer. He led many bands, from small ensembles to night club bands to orchestras. He worked with Latin American and Jamaican bands, including Kenny Graham's Afro-Cubists and Mike McKenzie's Quartet. He played with the Carl Barriteau orchestra, the Decca Records house band under Phil Green, and occasionally the Glenn Miller band. Wright was voted the 1980 BBC Jazz Society Musician of the Year.

During his career he worked with Stéphane Grappelli, Lonnie Donegan, Johnny Duncan, Digby Fairweather, Ella Fitzgerald, Ken Snakehips Johnson, Billy Eckstine, Fapy Lafertin, Russ Conway, Biréli Lagrène, Humphrey Lyttelton, Nigel Kennedy, and George Shearing.

Although best known as a guitarist, his favourite instrument was piano, the only musical instrument he would play at home. Travellin' Blues by Johnny Duncan and the Bluegrass Boys features Wright's piano-playing.

== Early life ==
Wright was born in Deptford, London, and grew up in Brockley with frequent forays to the Old Kent Road and the Elephant and Castle. His father was Joseph William Wright, a wireless telegraphist for the General Post Office who served with the Royal Engineers in the First World War. His mother was Selina Elizabeth Stewart, who was born in Hampstead. Wright's paternal family came from Polstead and Boxstead in Suffolk, although they moved to Deptford by 1881. Wright's first instrument was the piano. His older brother, Alex Wright, was a semi-professional guitarist before the war and Denny Wright, ten years younger, was soon trying to play his brother's guitar. He began playing professionally before the Second World War, while at school. He nearly always used his thumb on the top E string and could only play as fast as he could sing. He often sang along as he played a solo, as on Donegan's No. 4 UK hit "Don't You Rock Me Daddy-O", recorded in 1957.

== Career ==
Wright spent the first part of the Second World War playing in jazz clubs in the West End of London, doing session work and performing in bands on radio shows. He worked with Grappelli for the first time in London around 1941. At school Wright served with the Auxiliary Fire Service in Brockley. He was classified medically unfit to serve due to a childhood injury in a road accident in 1930 that cost him his spleen and half of his liver. He joined the Entertainments National Service Association (ENSA), entertained the troops, and at the end of the war was stationed in 's-Hertogenbosch, Netherlands.

In 1945 he started the first bebop club in London. At the Fullado in New Compton Street he played piano and guitar. In the late 1940s he toured Italy and the Middle East with the Francisco Cavez orchestra, and performed in King Farouk's palace.

Throughout the 1950s Wright provided guitar accompaniments for Lonnie Donegan, Johnny Duncan, Humphrey Lyttelton, and Marie Bryant, as well as appearing on Guitar Club on the BBC. In 1952, he accompanied Tex Ritter for a season at the Texas Western Spectacle at the Haringey Arena. With Digby Fairweather, Roy Williams, Johnny Van Derrick, Jack Fallon, and Tony Crombie, Wright accompanied Joel David on Old Bones and added a guitar solo to Joel David's song "Be My Valentine Tonight".

The Denny Wright Trio with violinist Bob Clarke took skiffle and jazz to the Soviet Union in 1957 for the 6th World Festival of Youth and Students. From 1940 until the early 1980s Wright worked as a session musician, playing guitar for Mary Hopkin, Dusty Springfield and Tom Jones. His improvisational style came to the forefront in his work with Donegan. Drawing on jazz, blues, and Django Reinhardt, Wright played acoustic archtop and electric guitar.

With Bill Bramwell, Les Bennetts, and Jimmy Currie, he helped inspire the next generation of British guitarists working with blues in a rock context. George Harrison tried to play Wright's solo from "Last Train to San Fernando".

In the 1960s, in addition to session for Mary Hopkin and Jones, he and Keith Cooper produced Tribute to the Hot Club as The Cooper-Wright Quintet. Wright also worked extensively with folk singer Steve Benbow and the record company Rediffusion. During the 1970s, he and record producer Anton Kwiatkowski worked on albums for EMI's Music for Pleasure label. He accompanied Grappelli at the Cambridge Folk Festival and for some years after.

In 1978, he formed the band Velvet with Ike Isaacs, Len Skeat, and Digby Fairweather. After Velvet, he formed a band with Don Harper before reforming the Hot Club of London with Johnny Van Derrick (violin), Gerry Higgins (double bass), and his protégé Robert Seaman (guitar). Wright played with the Hot Club of London across the UK, as well as at jazz festivals in Eindhoven, London, and Cork. His last performance was at The Grapes in Shepherd Market, Mayfair in late 1991 with van Derrick.

Wright gave private lessons and at London comprehensive schools, and he lectured at the Royal College of Music on the life of a session musician.

== Personal life ==
Wright married Barbara, a lyricist and actress, in 1961. Their son, St. John, was born while Wright was on stage in Leeds with Donegan in 1963. Barbara died on 16 February 1989 after an eight-year battle with breast cancer. They were married for 27 years. Wright died on 8 February 1992 in London after a nine-year battle with bladder cancer.

== Awards and honors ==
In 1980, Wright was voted BBC Jazz Society Musician of the Year.

== Discography ==
=== As leader ===
- 1971 Mr. Guitar

=== As sideman ===
With Lonnie Donegan

- 1956 Lonnie Donegan Showcase
- 1957 Lonnie Donegan Live, 1957

With Johnny Duncan

- 1957 Johnny Duncan's Tennessee Song Bag
- 1996 Last Train to San Fernando

With Stéphane Grappelli

- 1973 Live in London
- 1974 I Got Rhythm
- 1975 Fascinating Rhythm
- 1988 Menuhin & Grappelli Play Berlin, Kern, Porter & Rodgers & Hart
- 1988 Menuhin & Grappelli Play Gershwin
- 1997 Sweet Georgia Brown
- 1998 Fit as a Fiddle
- 1998 Live in Europe
- 2000 Live at the Cambridge Folk Festival

With others

- 1955 Barrel House, Johnny Parker's Washboard Band
- 1969 Tribute to the Hot Club, Cooper-Wright Quintet
- 1972 Friendly Folk, Steve Benbow
- 1978 Combo Don Harper
- 1979 Velvet, Digby Fairweather, Ike Isaacs, Len Skeat
- 1981 Solo Flight, Wild Bill Davison
- 1993 Running Wild, Wild Bill Davison
- 1993 Songs of Ireland, Steve Benbow
- 2008 The Early Years, George Shearing

=== Singles ===
- "Georgia", Marie Bryant with the Mike McKenzie Quartet (1954)
- "Lost John" (Trad. arr. Donegan), Lonnie Donegan (1956) (2)
- "Stewball" (Trad. arr. Donegan), Lonnie Donegan (1956) (2)
- "Bring a Little Water, Sylvie" (Trad. arr. Ledbetter, Donegan, Campbell), Lonnie Donegan (1956) (7)
- "Don't You Rock Me Daddy-O" (Varley, Whyton), Lonnie Donegan (1956) (4)
- "Cumberland Gap" (Trad. arr. Donegan), Lonnie Donegan (1957) (1)
- "Last Train to San Fernando", Johnny Duncan (1957) (2)
