= Steve Benbow =

British guitarist, singer and music director

- Birth name: Stephen George Benbow
- Also known as: Steve Benbow
- Born: 29 November 1931; Tooting, Surrey, England
- Died: 17 November 2006 (aged 74)
- Genres: Folk music
- Occupation: Musician
- Instrument: Guitar
- Years active: 1957–2006 (49 years)

Stephen George "Steve" Benbow (29 November 1931 – 17 November 2006), was a British folk guitar player, singer and music director, who was influential in the English folk music revival of the 1960s. His obituary in The Times described him as "a seminal influence on a whole generation of guitarists".

== Early life ==
He was born in Tooting, Surrey and educated at Reigate Grammar School. On leaving school, despite an aptitude for languages, he took a job on a farm in Axminster, Devon. He did his National Service in the Royal Army Veterinary Corps, and was stationed in the Middle East. There, he learnt the guitar and quickly gained popularity entertaining the troops, including appearances on forces radio where he reportedly sang songs in eight languages.

After completing his stint in the army, he returned to farming but also began working as a part-time musician. He played trad jazz with Dave Kier's jazz band and began accompanying some of the emerging British folk singers such as Ewan MacColl and A. L. Lloyd.

== Musical career ==
His solo recording began in 1957 when he recorded two albums: Steve Benbow Sings English Folk Songs and Steve Benbow sings American Folk Songs. He went on to record over 20 albums. The last, Don't Monkey with My Gun was recorded in 2003.

He was a successful broadcaster, especially during the 1950s, appearing on Guitar Club, Saturday Skiffle Club and Easy Beat. He also hosted a show on Radio Luxembourg in the 1960s.

He collaborated with Spike Milligan on a West End stage show and a television series Muses with Milligan.

He worked as a producer with Dominic Behan and Christy Moore: he was, for example, credited as arranger and musical director of Moore's 1969 album Paddy on the Road. Throughout his career he worked with a wide range of musicians, including Alan Lomax, Robin Hall and Jimmie Macgregor, Pete and Peggy Seeger, Denny Wright, Alex Campbell, Martin Carthy, Cy Grant, Michael Holliday, Rolf Harris, Long John Baldry and Don Partridge. He is credited with being an early influence on Davey Graham and Wizz Jones.

== Later years ==
In later years, he worked as a London cabbie, but continued to appear at folk clubs. He also retained his affinity with domestic animals, keeping goats and a donkey at his home in Hanwell. He maintained a traditional London trolley and was often seen navigating suburban streets in this donkey-drawn cart. Steve Benbow was still playing in pubs around Brentford, Isleworth and Hounslow until the Friday before his death.

== Personal life ==
He was married twice, having a son and a daughter by his first marriage.

== Discography ==
- 1957 Steve Benbow Sings English Folk Songs
- 1957 Steve Benbow Sings American Folk Songs
- 1958 Sinful Songs
- 1959 Steve Benbow's Folk Four
- 1959 Mixed Bag
- 1960 A Jug of Punch
- 1960 Rocket Along
- 1960 A Pinch of Salt
- 1960 The Hermit & The Mole Catcher And Other Songs
- 1961 Ballad of Little Musgrave
- 1962 Steve Benbow Sings Admiral Benbow
- 1963 I Travel The World
- 1964 Steve Benbow Tells About This That and the Other
- 1965 Irish Songs
- 1965 Journey into The Sun
- 1966 Songs of Ireland (with The Strawberry Hill Boys) (Monitor Records)
- 1967 Of Situations And Predicaments
- 1970 Little Drummer Boy
- 1970 Next Time Round
- 1970 Little Red Donkey
- 1971 Steve Benbow Sings Irish Songs
- 1971 Steve Benbow With Denny Wright
- 1972 Friendly Folk
- 1977 Steve Benbow Sings Irish And Other Songs
- 2003 Don't Monkey with My Gun
