= Alan Elsdon =

- Born: Alan Elsdon; 15 October 1934; London, England
- Died: 2 May 2016 (aged 81)
- Genres: Jazz; Dixieland jazz
- Occupation(s): Musician; Bandleader
- Instruments: Trumpet; Flugelhorn

Alan Elsdon (15 October 1934 – 2 May 2016) was an English jazz trumpeter and flugelhornist.

== Biography ==
Elsdon was born in London on 15 October 1934. He studied trumpet under Tommy McQuater. His early professional work included time with Cy Laurie (1954–56), Graham Stewart and his 'Graham Stewart Seven' (1957–58), a Royal Air Force band, and Terry Lightfoot (1959–61); with Lightfoot he played alongside Kid Ory and Red Allen. Elsdon led his own band from 1961 (he made an appearance on 1 June 1962 in a TV series called All That Jazz) into the 1990s, and during the 1960s also played with Edmond Hall, Albert Nicholas, Wingy Manone, and Howlin' Wolf.

Elsdon played in Keith Nicholls' Midnite Follies Orchestra from 1978 to 1985, as well as in small groups with Nichols around the same time. The Alan Elsdon Band made an appearance at a 'jazz weekend' in November 1991 at Badger's Mount Jazz Club in Halstead, Kent.

He was also active as a writer and educator.

He died on 2 May 2016.

== Discography ==
- Jazz Journeymen (Black Lion, 1977)
- Dixieland Favourites (EMI & Hamlyn, 1970)
- Alan Elsdon Presents... (Columbia UK, 1964)
