= Midnite Follies Orchestra =

British jazz band (1978–2020s)

- Years active: 1978 - 1980s, 1990s, 2020s
- Labels: EMI, Odeon, ASV

Midnite Follies Orchestra was formed in Britain in 1978, by jazz musicians Keith Nichols and Alan Cohen, dedicated to recreating standards by some of early jazz musicians. The orchestra more or less disbanded in the 1990s. The Midnite Follies Orchestra had showcased a variety of musicians over the years, including Nick Stevenson, Digby Fairweather, Alan Elsdon, Dave Savill, Laurie Chescoe, Keith Greville, Randolph Colville, Olaf Vas, Mac White, Will Hastie, John Barnes, Gordon Blundy and Peter Strange. During the orchestra's active years, it was often featured on BBC television and radio.

== Background ==
The group was put together by Keith Nichols with co-leader Alan Cohen. They played the music or Harlem that was previously performed by Duke Ellington and Cab Calloway. They were the only group in Europe that specialized in the music of Duke Ellington.

Members Laurie Chescoe and Will Hastie had been members of Eric Allandale's New Orleans Knights band in the early 1960s.

== Career ==
=== 1970s ===
It was mentioned in the 25 March 1978 issue of Music Week that Midnite Follies Orchestra had signed to the MOR division of EMI.

James Hamilton gave a short review on their single "No Strings". He said that it was "Really useful '30s-style Pasadena-type MoR quickstepper, lovely and jolly". He also said that it was for old folks. "No Strings" was getting airplay on Radio 210 in Thames Valley for the week of 14 October 1978.

Along with Max Collie's Rhythm Aces and Monty Sunshine, the ensemble played at the Hot Jazz Spectacular, Fairfield Halls in 1979. In August that year the group having appeared some time back at the White Rock and performing well was appearing at the Winter Gardens in Eastbourne.

=== 1980s ===
On 23 May 1982, the ensemble was to appear with jazz singer Adelaide Hall in her debut at the Queen Elizabeth Hall in London. The event was a Duke Ellington anniversary concert.

The group were set to give their Duke Ellington tribute performance on Friday 25 May 1984.

In 1989 the ensemble played at the Queen Elizabeth Hall.

=== Later years ===
Keith Nichols died on January 20, 2021.

A tribute to Keith Nichols had been organized for Wed 20 Sep 2023 at the Main club. Participating musicians include, Johnny M. on vocals, Mike Henry, Enrico Tomasso, and Pete Rudeforth on trumpets, Alistair Allan, and Andy Flaxman on trombones, Michael McQuaid, Robert Fowler, and David Horniblow on saxophones. The rhythm section includes, Martin Litton on piano, Thomas "Spats" Langham on sousaphone, Graham Read on double bass and Richard Pite on drums.

== Discography ==
=== Single ===
- "No Strings" / "Minnie the Moocher" – EMI, Odeon ODO 101 – 1978

=== Albums ===
- Hotter Than Hades – EMI, Odeon ODN 1001 – 1978
- Jungle Nights in Harlem – ASV ALA 3002 – 1981
