= Charly Antolini =

Swiss jazz drummer (born 1937)

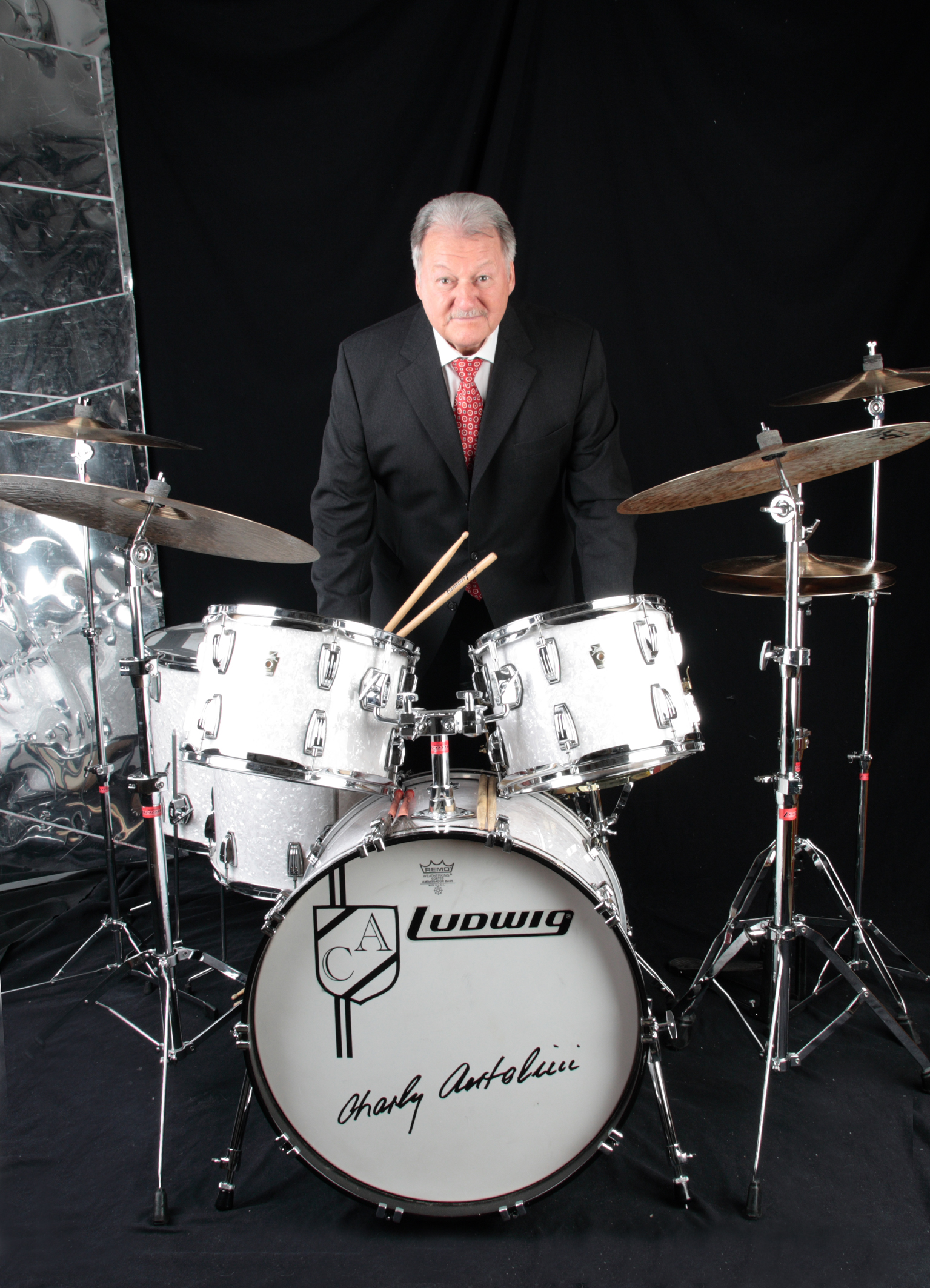

Background information
- Born: May 24, 1937 (age 87); Zürich, Switzerland
- Genres: Jazz
- Occupation: Musician
- Instrument: Drums
- Years active: 1950s–present
- Website: http://www.charly-antolini.de/

Charly Antolini (born 24 May 1937) is a Swiss jazz drummer.

== Career ==
Born in Zürich, Antolini started playing the traditional Swiss Basler drum. In 1956, he went to Paris, where he played with Sidney Bechet and Bill Coleman. He joined the Tremble Kids with trumpeter Oscar Klein and clarinettist Werner Keller. In 1962 he lived in Stuttgart, Germany, where he spent five years playing with bassist Peter Witte and pianist Horst Jankowski in the SWR Big Band led by Erwin Lehn. With Witte, between 1965 and 1967, he recorded five albums for the Romanian pianist Eugen Cicero, who combined classical music with jazz. He also played in big bands with Kurt Edelhagen, Peter Herbolzheimer, and Max Greger in the NDR Bigband.

In 1976 he formed Charly Antolini's Jazz Power with Steve Hooks (tenor sax), Andrei Lobanov (trumpet), David Gazarov (keyboards). and Rocky Knauer (bass). Later members were Len Skeat and Brian Lemon. In the 1980s he toured Germany, Italy, and Denmark with Benny Goodman, as well as with Lionel Hampton, Barbara Dennerlein, Albert Mangelsdorff, Earl Hines, Roy Eldridge, Jimmy Giuffre, Art Farmer, Oliver Nelson, Art Van Damme, Stuff Smith, and Baden Powell. In the late 1980s-early 1990s he recorded four albums with British tenor saxophonist Dick Morrissey, three of which were live, and in 1994 he started the Super Trio with pianist Dirk Raufeisen and bassist Jimmy Woode.

== Discography ==
=== As leader ===
- Drum Beat (SABA, 1966)
- Soul Beat (MPS, 1968)
- In the Groove (MPS/BASF, 1972)
- Atomic Drums (Columbia, 1972)
- Jazz Power/Live (Plane, 1978)
- Knock Out (Jeton, 1979)
- Special Delivery (MPS, 1980)
- Countdown (Jeton, 1980)
- Crash (Jeton, 1981)
- Menue (Jeton, 1982)
- Bop Dance (Jazz Publications, 1982)
- Finale (Jeton, 1983)
- Caravan (Extra, 1985)
- Wow!!! (Verve, 1987)
- A Swinging Affair (Ariola, 1989)
- Live On Tour! with Barbara Dennerlein (BEBAB, 1989)
- Cookin (L+R, 1990)
- Recorded at the BBC Studio London (Bell, 1991)
- Charly Antolini Meets Dick Morrissey (Bell, 1992)
- On the Beat (Bell, 1993)
- Chicago Dixieland Swiss Made (Downtown, 1994)
- Swing Explosion with Gerry Hayes (Bell, 1994)
- Right On! (Bell, 1995)
- Knock Out 2000 (Inak, 1999)
- Swing Kings (ACT, 2001)
- Love to Play! (Skinfire, 2001)
- Live in Concert (Skinfire, 2003)
- The Jubilee 2006 Mixing Stuff (Skinfire, 2006)
- Good Time Together (Skinfire, 2013)
- Groove Merchant (Skinfire, 2015)

=== As sideman ===
With Eugen Cicero

- Rokoko Jazz (SABA, 1965)
- In Town (SABA, 1965)
- Swinging Tschaikowsky (SABA, 1966)
- Cicero's Chopin (SABA, 1966)
- Romantic Swing (SABA, 1968)
- Balkan Rhapsody (MPS, 1970)
- Klavierspielereien (MPS/BASF, 1971)
- Swinging Classics (MPS, 1972)
- Highlights (MPS/BASF, 1976)
- Presenting Eugen Cicero (MPS, 1978)
- Classics in Rhythm (MPS, 1986)

With Horst Jankowski

- Traumklang und Rhythmus mit Horst Jankowski (Mercury, 1965)
- Horst Jankowski Quartet/Horst Jankowski with Bernie's Swing Five (Orix, 1978)
- Piano Interlude (Intersound, 1994)

With Art Van Damme

- Art van Damme (SR, 1967)
- The Gentle Art of Art (SABA, 1967)
- Ecstasy (SABA, 1967)
- Art in the Black Forest (MPS, 1968)
- Lullaby in Rhythm (MPS, 1968)
- Art and Four Brothers (MPS, 1969)
- On the Road (MPS, 1969)
- The Many Moods of Art (BASF 1972)
- Invitation (MPS/BASF, 1974)
- With Strings (MPS, 1979)

With others

- Svend Asmussen, Jazz Fiddlin' Around (Murbo, 1967)
- Francis Coppieters, Rosen fur Dich (Cornet Special, 1968)
- Fatty George, Fatty '78 (MPS, 1978)
- Jack Hammer, Jack Hammer Presents: This Is My Song (Bellaphon, 1978)
- Benny Goodman, Berlin 1980 (TCB, 1996)
- George Gruntz, Drums and Folklore: From Sticksland with Love (SABA, 1967)
- Danny Moss, Steamers! (Nagel Heyer, 1999)
- Danny Moss, Steam Power! (Nagel Heyer, 2002)
- Baden Powell, Poema on Guitar (MPS/SABA, 1967)
- Dieter Reith, A Happy Afternoon (SABA, 1966)
- Kristian Schultze, Jazz Rock Made in Germany (Kick/OBH, 2010)
- The Singers Unlimited, Feelings (MPS/Universal, 2007)
- Stuff Smith, Black Violin (SABA, 1967)
- Joe Turner & Albert Nicholas, Joe & Nick + Two (Columbia, 1958)
