= Doug Dobell =

British record producer (1918–1987)

- Born: Douglas Arthur Dobell; 29 March 1918; London, England
- Died: 10 July 1987 (aged 69); Nice, France
- Occupations: Record store proprietor, record producer
- Years active: c. 1946–1980
- Known for: Owner of Dobell's Record Shop and founder of 77 Records
- Relatives: Bertram Dobell (grandfather)

Douglas Arthur Dobell (29 March 1918 – 10 July 1987) was a British record store proprietor and record producer who ran Dobell's Record Shop in Charing Cross Road, London, and 77 Records. He was involved in developing, recording and marketing jazz, blues, folk and world music in the UK, from the 1950s to the 1980s.

== Background ==
Dobell was born in London in 1918. He was the grandson of Bertram Dobell (1842–1914), who had been born of Huguenot descent in Battle, Sussex. Bertram Dobell opened a stationer's shop in London in 1869, and began selling second-hand books, establishing his first antiquarian bookshop on Charing Cross Road in 1887. He acquired, and published in 1906, lost manuscripts by the poet Thomas Traherne. After his death, his premises on Charing Cross Road were taken over by his sons, Percy and Arthur Dobell.

From 1939, Doug Dobell served for seven years in the British Army. By the time he returned to work for his father and uncle after the war, he had become a keen collector of jazz records, and in 1946 he persuaded his father that he should begin to sell collectable and imported jazz records at the family bookshop at 77 Charing Cross Road. The part of the store selling records gradually expanded, and when his father retired in 1955 the rare books part of the business was phased out. Over the next few years, the store became London's best known jazz shop and a well known haunt for both local and visiting jazz, blues and folk musicians and enthusiasts. In the mid-1950s, Dobell opened a branch of Dobells in Brighton managed by Don Sollash and Bill Colyer.

In 1957, Dobell established 77 Records, so named because of the store's address, and began recording both British trad jazz and rhythm and blues performers such as Acker Bilk and Alexis Korner, and visiting American musicians such as Ramblin' Jack Elliott and Lightnin' Hopkins, in a small recording studio on the premises. A 1963 album by Dick Fariña and Eric von Schmidt, released on the offshoot Folklore label, featured "Blind Boy Grunt", alias Bob Dylan, on harmonica. He also reissued recordings licensed from independent American record labels such as Arhoolie.

From the mid-1960s, Dobell also began recording visiting African musicians, such as Dudu Pukwana. In addition, he ran a mail order record distribution company, Agate, and record import company C.R.D., which issued Folkways, Blue Note and was the first company in the UK to make Elektra Records available to the general public. This was run from the second outpost shop, Dobell's Folk and Blues Shop at 10 Rathbone Place, the manager being Ron Gould. When the lease expired, the whole operation moved to 75 Charing Cross Road, which in turn then became Dobell's Folk Record Shop, with the original Jazz Record Shop next door.

Dobell's record shops were forced to close in late 1980, when the area was redeveloped. He died of a heart attack in 1987, aged 69, while visiting a jazz festival in Nice, France.
