= Keith Nichols =

British musician (1945–2021)

- Born: 13 February 1945
- Origin: Ilford, Essex, England
- Died: 20 January 2021 (aged 75); London, England
- Genres: Jazz
- Occupation: Musician
- Instrument(s): piano, trombone, reeds, accordion
- Labels: Stomp Off

Keith Nichols (13 February 1945 – 21 January 2021) was an English jazz multi-instrumentalist and arranger, a player of the piano, trombone, reeds, and accordion.

== Biography ==
Born in Ilford, Essex, England, Nichols was a child actor and an award-winning accordionist in his youth. He began by playing ragtime tunes, gaining notice in the 1970s in London when forming the band New Sedalia. Nichols also formed the Ragtime Orchestra in the mid-1970s, along with Mo Morris, Richard Warner and Paul Nossiter. Nichols recorded and gigged with Bing Crosby, and Dick Sudhalter during this period. Over time, he moved on to Dixieland jazz, Swing, and orchestral Jazz, including the oeuvres of Paul Whiteman and Duke Ellington.

Nichols was also a frequent sideman for the EMI record label and an arranger for the New York Jazz Repertory Company, Dick Hyman and the Pasadena Roof Orchestra. In 1978, he helped lead the Midnite Follies Orchestra with Alan Cohen. Other artists Nichols worked with include Digby Fairweather, Harry Gold, Richard Pite and Claus Jacobi. He died on 21 January 2021, after contracting COVID-19 during the COVID-19 pandemic in the United Kingdom while being treated for another condition, at The Royal London Hospital.

== Discography ==
Paramount Theatre Orchestra (1984) (LP, Stomp Off)

- Lolly Pops

Dreamland Syncopators

- Territory Jazz (1987) (LP, Stomp Off)

Julian Vincent and Keith Nichols

- Morton to Mozart (1989) (CD, Poppy HXP012)

Keith Nichols' Cotton Club Gang and Janice Day with Guy Barker

- I Like To Do Things For You (1991) (CD, Stomp Off)

Keith Nichols and the Cotton Club Orchestra

- Syncopated Jamboree (1991) (CD, Stomp Off CD 1242)
- Henderson Stomp (1993) (CD, Stomp Off CD 1234)
- Harlem's Arabian Nights (1997) (CD, Stomp Off CD 130)

Keith Nichols' Little Devils

- The Charmful Little Armful (2003) (PEK)

Keith Nichols and the Blue Devils

- Kansas City Breakdown (2004) (CD, Stomp Off CD 1387)

Keith Nichols' Earthbound Spirits

- Harlem Madness (2004) (CD, PKCD-237)

Keith Nichols' Collegians

- Collegiate Rhythm (2006) (CD, PEK PKCD-299)

Mike Lovell and Keith Nichols

- Dixieland at the Thornton Little Theatre (2006) (CD, PEK)

Keith Nichols' Jazz Artists and Northern Sinfonia

- A Tribute to Paul Whiteman (2007) (CD, Lake Records LACD245)

Thomas "Spats" Langham / Keith Nichols / Richard Pite

- London Omnibus (2010) (Jazz Repertory Company)

The Nichols-Duffee International Jazz Orchestra

- One More Time (2013) (CD, Lake)
