= Digby Fairweather =

British jazz trumpeter, author, and broadcaster (born 1946)

- Born: Richard John Charles Fairweather; 25 April 1946 (age 80); Rochford, Essex, England
- Genres: Jazz
- Occupations: Musician; broadcaster; author
- Instrument: Trumpet
- Years active: 1977–present
- Website: digbyfairweather.com

Richard John Charles "Digby" Fairweather (born 25 April 1946) is a British jazz trumpeter, author, and broadcaster.

== Biography ==
Before becoming a professional musician, Fairweather was a librarian (1965-76) and has since retained an interest in jazz bibliography and archiving.

He led his first band, Dig's Half Dozen, in 1971 and recorded in 1973 with Alex Welsh. Four years later, he joined the quartet 'Velvet', with Ike Isaacs, Len Skeat, and Denny Wright, and was a member of the Midnite Follies Orchestra (1977-8) and the PizzaExpress All-Stars.(1978-81). In 1983 he toured a band paying tribute to veteran British trumpeter Nat Gonella and worked with Gonella until his death in 1998 . He also worked as co-leader with clarinetist Dave Shepherd and as sideman for Alex Welsh, Tiny Winters, Brian Priestley and others. In the 1980s and 1990s, he led the Jazz Superkings (1988-94), the Great British Jazz Band (1994-2005), and a newly-formed edition of his original Half Dozen (1995-2023). During the 1990s, he was part of the Salute to Satchmo and replaced trumpeter Kenny Baker in the 'Best of British Jazz' show 1999-2006.

In 1979 Fairweather co-founded the 'Jazz College' charity with pianist Stan Barker to introduce improvisation in schools. He also established the Association of British Jazz Musicians, and the National Jazz Archive in 1987. He co-wrote Jazz: The Essential Companion (1987) with Brian Priestley and Ian Carr.[1] In 2000, the book was republished as The Rough Guide to Jazz.[2]

Fairweather's musical style has been influenced by Louis Armstrong, Ruby Braff, Billy Butterfield, Bobby Hackett, Red Nichols, and Nat Gonella. Digby's Half Dozen toured and recorded with singer George Melly in the later years of his career (2003–2007). Fairweather's band toured with singer Paul Jones in their presentation "Rocking in Rhythm" from 2007-2018.

Apart from his playing and group leading, Fairweather has long pursued a parallel career as a jazz broadcaster and writer. From 1985 to 1988, he worked and recorded with Brian Priestley's Special Septet and Tony Milliner's Mingus Music and wrote the book How to Play Trumpet. By 1990, he had embarked on a dual vocation as broadcaster for BFBS, the BBC World Service, Jazz FM (1991–92), and BBC Radios 2 and 3 (1992–98), including occasionally deputising for Humphrey Lyttelton on his show Best of Jazz and successively presenting Jazz Parade and Jazz Notes.

In 2016, Fairweather founded 'The Jazz Centre UK', a registered charity (no. 1167421) whose aim is to promote, preserve, and celebrate the culture of jazz in all its forms.

== Awards and honors ==
- Musician of the Year, BBC Jazz Society, 1979
- Freedom, City of London, 1992
- British Jazz Award (trumpet), 1992
- Benno Haussmann Award, Cork Jazz Festival, 1993
- Freedom of Southend on Sea, Millennium Role of Honour, 2000
- Top Small Group (Digby's Half Dozen), British Jazz Awards, 2005, 2006, 2008–2015
- Lifetime Achievement Award for Services to Jazz, Worshipful Company of Musicians London, 2013
- Services to British Jazz, British Jazz Awards, 2015

== Discography ==
=== As leader/co-leader ===
- Havin' Fun (Black Lion, 1979)
- Going Out Stepping (Black Lion, 1979)
- Songs for Sandy (Hep, 1981)
- Anytime, Any Place, Anywhere (Hep, 1982)
- A Portrait of Digby Fairweather (Black Lion, 1991)
- Mick Potts Tribute Concert (Flat Five, 1993)
- Squeezin' the Blues Away with Tony Compton (FMR, 1994)
- The Quality of Mercer with Susannah McCorkle and Keith Ingham (Jazz Alliance, 1996)
- Twelve Feet Off the Ground (Flat Five, 1998)
- Singing and Swinging the Blues with George Melly (Robinwood Productions, 2003)
- Things Ain't What They Used to Be (Robinwood, 2003)
- The Ultimate Melly (Candid, 2006)
- Two Part Conversations with Craig Milverton (Raymersound, 2006)
- Partners in Time with Pete Strange (Rose Cottage, 2006)
- Farewell Blues with George Melly (Lake, 2007)
- Jazz at the Stone Hall with Dave Claridge (Rose Cottage, 2009)
- Crackerbarrel Music (Hainault, 2011)
- To Frederick with Affection (Rose Cottage, 2012)

== Publications ==
- Fairweather, Digby (2002). Notes from a Jazz Life. London: Northway Books. ISBN 978-0953704019.
- Fairweather, Digby (2005). Nat Gonella: A Life in Jazz. London: Northway Books. ISBN 978-0953704071.
- Fairweather, Digby (2007). On the Road with George Melly: the Final Bows of a Legend. London: JR Books. ISBN 978-1906217327.
- Priestley, Brian; Ian Carr; Digby Fairweather (2007). The Rough Guide to Jazz. Rough Guides. ISBN 978-1843532569.
- Ace of Clubs: A Celebration of the 100 Club, foreword by Jools Holland, Edited by Digby Fairweather, 2021, ISBN 9781858587288
