= Terry Lightfoot =

British jazz clarinettist and bandleader (1935–2013)

- Born: Terence John Lightfoot; 21 May 1935; Potters Bar, Middlesex, England
- Died: 15 March 2013 (aged 77) Milton Keynes, Buckinghamshire, England
- Genres: Jazz; Trad Jazz
- Occupations: Musician; Bandleader
- Instruments: Clarinet
- Years active: 1950-2013

Terence John Lightfoot (21 May 1935 – 15 March 2013) was a British jazz clarinettist and bandleader, and together with Chris Barber, Acker Bilk and Kenny Ball was one of the leading members of the trad jazz generation of British jazzmen.

== Early life ==
Lightfoot was born in Potters Bar, Middlesex, England. He started his musical career as a vocalist during school life, singing popular songs with a small amateur variety group. In 1949, he came to jazz while at Enfield Grammar School in Enfield Town. He changed from playing the trumpet to clarinet to meet the needs of the traditional Dixieland jazz band of his friends. After leaving school, he formed his first jazz band, the Wood Green Stompers.

== Trad jazz ==
In 1955, he formed his band, Terry Lightfoot's New Orleans Jazzmen. They had three minor hits in the UK Singles Chart in 1961 and 1962, "True Love", "King Kong" and "Tavern in the Town". The Jazzmen made regular appearances on Sunday nights at the Wood Green Jazz Club.

== Death ==
Lightfoot died in Milton Keynes General Hospital on 15 March 2013, aged 77, after suffering with prostate cancer.
