= Brecon Guildhall =

Municipal Building in Brecon, Wales

- Neuadd y Dref Aberhonddu (Welsh)
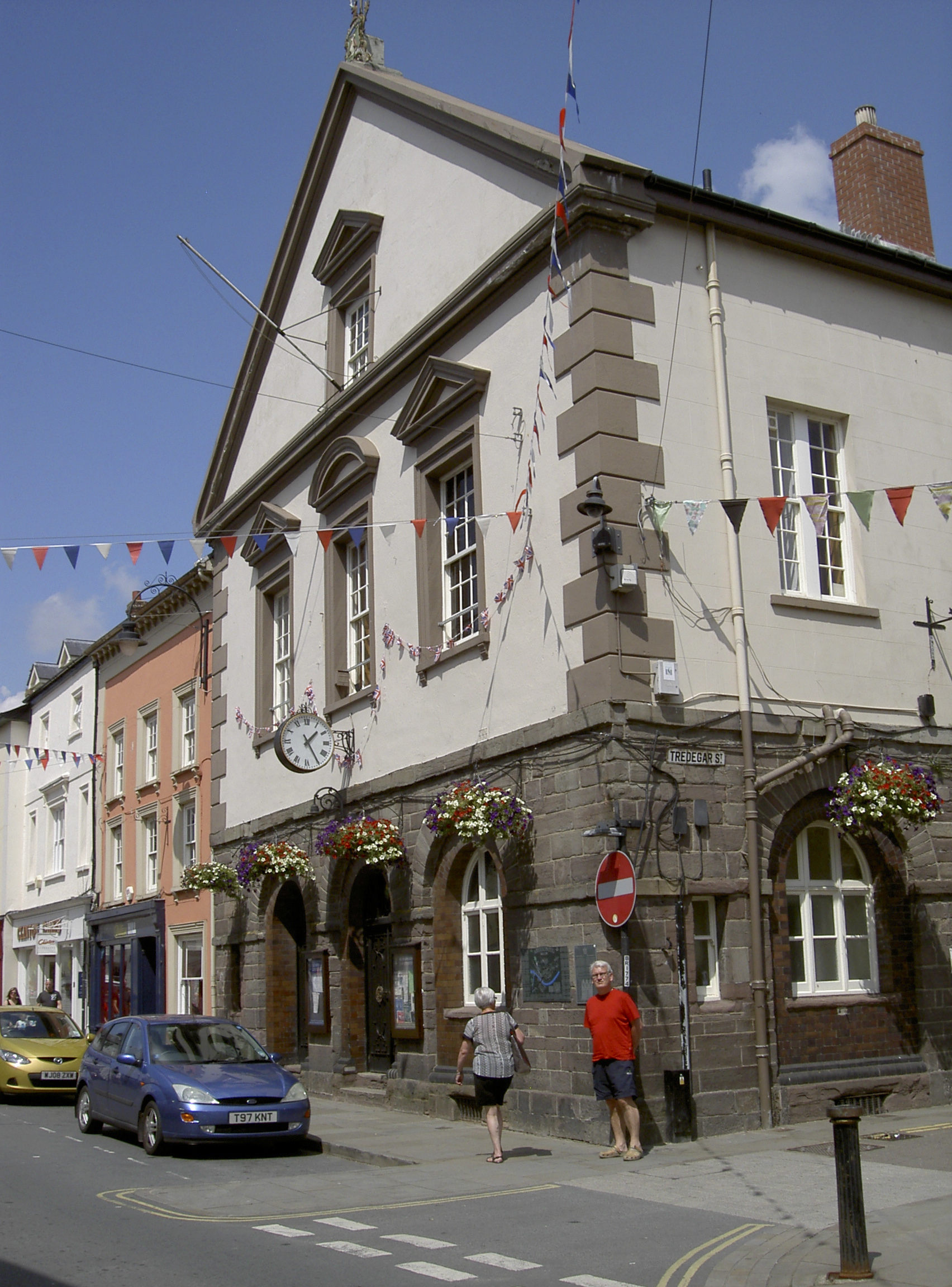
- Brecon Guildhall

- Shown in Powys
- 51.9475°N 3.3907°W
- Location: High Street, Brecon

History
- Built: 1771

Site notes
- Architectural style: Neoclassical style

Listed Building – Grade II
- Official name: Town Hall
- Designated: 16 January 1952
- Reference no.: 6908

Brecon Guildhall (Welsh: Neuadd y Dref Aberhonddu), is a municipal building in the High Street, Brecon, Powys, Wales. The structure, which is the meeting place of Brecon Town Council, is a Grade II listed building.

== History ==
The first municipal building in the town was a Tudor era guildhall which was completed in 1556. This was replaced by a structure designed by John Abel of Hereford which was timber-framed and completed in 1624. The building was arcaded on the ground floor, so that markets could be held, with an assembly hall on the first floor. At roof level, it featured three gables with a sundial, which was inscribed with the words Soles Nobis Pereunt et Imputantur (English: The hours are consumed and will be charged to our account), installed in the centre gable.

After the second guildhall became dilapidated, the floors above ground were demolished and a new structure was commissioned in 1770. The new building was designed in the neoclassical style, built by Andrew Maund in ashlar stone on the ground floor with a stucco finish on the first floor, and was completed in 1771. The design involved a symmetrical main frontage with three bays facing onto the High Street. The ground floor featured three round headed openings with voussoirs, while the first floor was fenestrated by sash windows with architraves and pediments, the central pediment being segmental and the outer pediments being triangular. The whole structure was surmounted by a modillioned pediment with a further sash window, with a triangular pediment, in the tympanum. Internally, the principal rooms were a market hall and an armoury on the ground floor and an assembly hall on the first floor.

The building was refurbished at the expense of the former local member of parliament, Sir Charles Morgan, 1st Baronet, for £500 in 1809 and remodelled at the expense of the High Sheriff of Brecknockshire, Lieutenant-Colonel John Morgan, of Lion Street, Brecon, for £3,000 in 1889: the remodelling involved the infilling of the arcading on the ground floor to create a mayor's parlour and a courtroom on that floor. The building was used as the meeting place of Brecon Borough Council but also as a local events venue: events held in the guildhall included a meeting calling for the abolition of slavery in February 1826 and a meeting calling for women's suffrage in January 1915. In January 1919, John Williams, who had been awarded the Victoria Cross for his bravery at the Battle of Rorke's Drift in 1879 during the Anglo-Zulu War and who had re-enlisted to serve at Brecon Barracks in 1914 at the start of the First World War, attended the town hall to receive a presentation in recognition of his service in the recent war.

The building continued to serve as the meeting place of the borough council for much of the 20th century but ceased to be the local seat of government when the enlarged Brecknock District Council was formed in 1974. Instead it became the meeting place of Brecon Town Council. The Brecon Jazz Festival, which started in 1984, was held annually in the guildhall until the Theatr Brycheiniog was completed in 1997. The singer Charlotte Church performed at a concert in the guildhall in August 2012.

Works of art in the town hall include a portrait by Hans Schadow of the opera singer, Adelina Patti, who lived at Craig-y-Nos Castle, and a portrait by Isaac Cooke of Gwenllian Morgan, the first woman in Wales to hold the office of mayor.
