= Jed Williams =

Welsh journalist (1952–2003)

John Ellis Dowell Williams, known as Jed Williams (12 June 1952 – 10 November 2003), was a Welsh jazz journalist and the founder and artistic director of the Brecon Jazz Festival.

Williams was born in Cardiff and educated at the Howardian Grammar School. By the time he left school, he was already a semi-professional jazz drummer. He played as a support musician for touring performers such as Wild Bill Davison and Buddy Tate.

In the 1980s, he became one of the organisers of the Welsh Jazz Society, and in 1983 became organiser of the Brecon Jazz Festival. In 1987, he opened The Four Bars Inn jazz club in Cardiff, Wales, and together with vocalist/trombonist Mike Harries formed the Inn's house band The Root Doctors.

In 1991, he founded the magazine JazzUK, which he also edited.
