= Theatr Brycheiniog =

Coordinates: 51.9439°N 3.3884°W

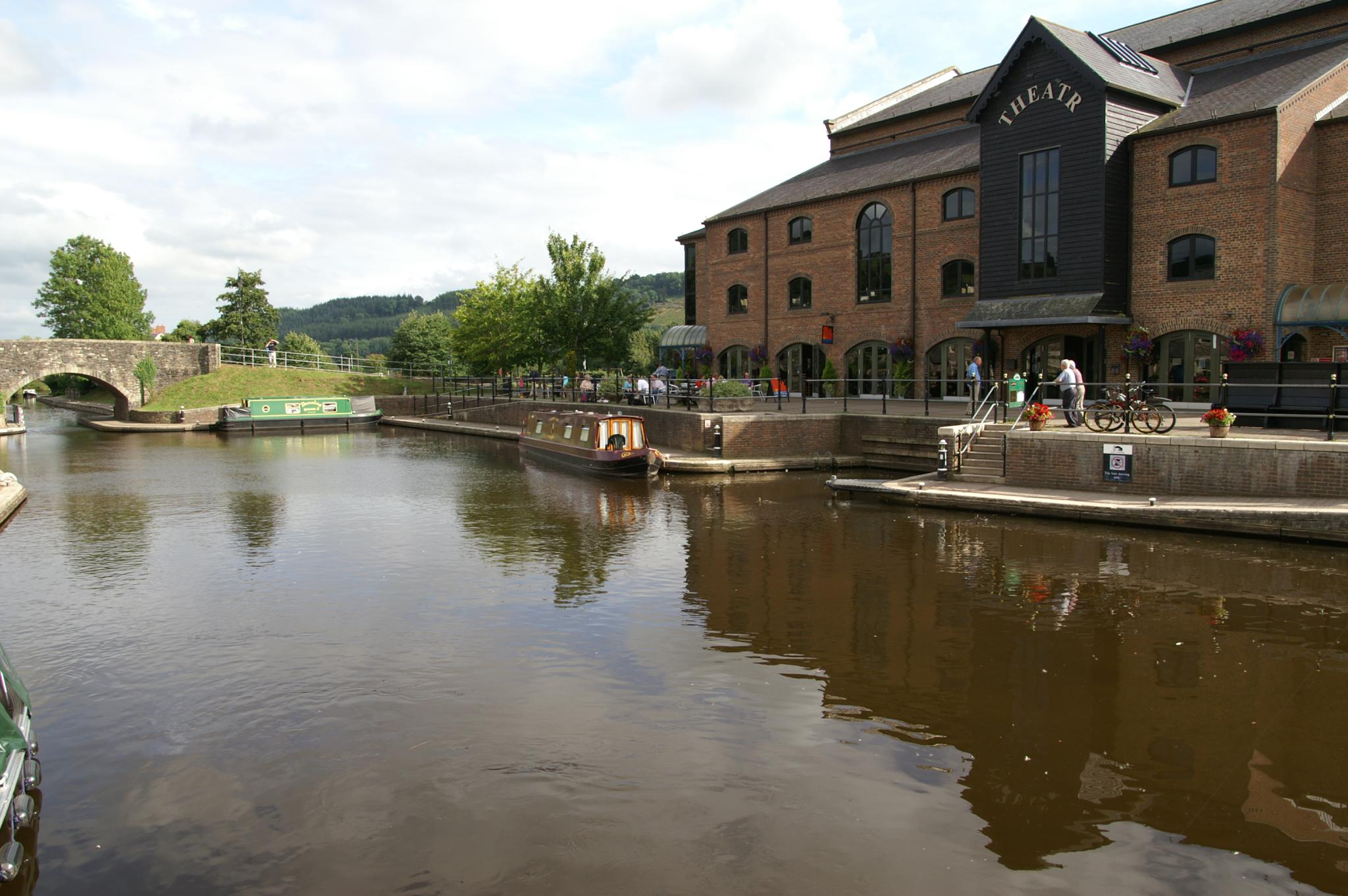
Theatr Brycheiniog on the basin of the Monmouthshire and Brecon Canal

Theatr Brycheiniog is an arts venue in Brecon, Powys, Wales.

== Location ==
Theatr Brycheiniog is located close to the centre of Brecon, on Canal Wharf fronting the Monmouthshire and Brecon Canal.

== Facilities ==
The complex comprises an 477-seater capacity auditorium for the performance of plays and live acts, a conference centre and spaces for community activities, a gallery and a bar and restaurant. The building has views of the Brecon Beacons National Park. It is built of red brick and with a roof of Welsh slate, to emulate a traditional canal warehouse.

Theatr Brycheiniog has hosted elements of the Brecon Jazz Festival, along with a range of acts including stand up comedians and folk singers, and both national and international orchestras, such as the Berlin Philharmonic wind quartet and the BBC National Orchestra of Wales.

The theatre's current patron is Rachel Podger; the director Michael Bogdanov was patron prior to his death.
