= The Four Bars Inn =

Pub in Cardiff, Wales

Coordinates: 51.4810°N 3.1817°W

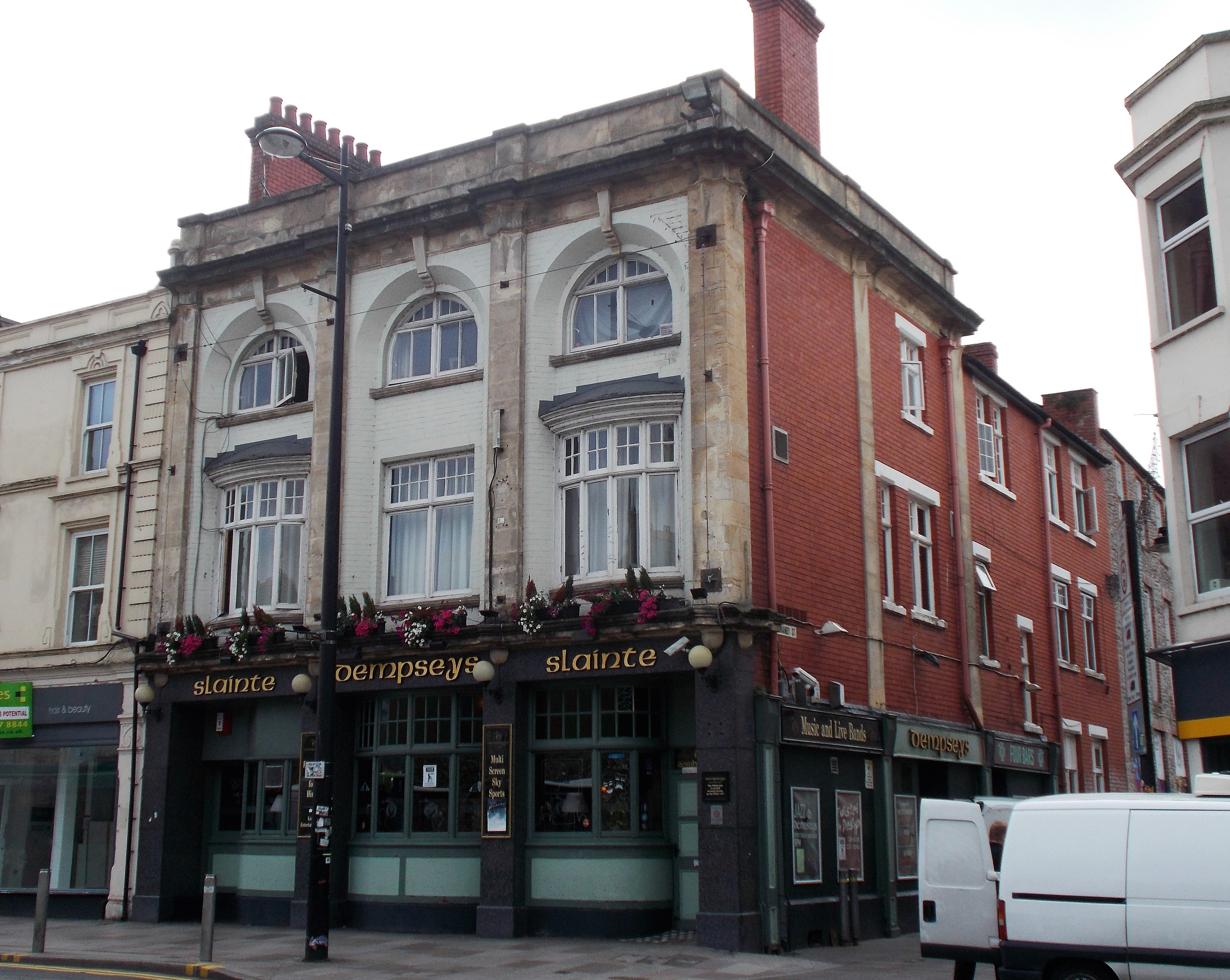
Dempsey's in 2016

The Four Bars Inn was a jazz club and public house in Cardiff, Wales, later known as 'Dempseys' and (since 2017) 'Elevens', a sports bar and grill.

The pub was originally called "The Globe" and dates back to 1731. It has also been known as "Dukes", before becoming "The Four Bars Inn" and later an Irish themed bar called "Dempseys".

The jazz club was founded by Jed Williams in 1987, who was also musical director of the Brecon Jazz Festival. Williams, together with vocalist/trombonist Mike Harries formed the Inn's house band The Root Doctors. The Inn featured live jazz seven days a week for many years. American blues and rock'n'roll legend Nappy Brown appeared there on 13 June 1988. Live jazz was performed once or twice per week.

In 2009 the Four Bars Inn was named by the Brecon Jazz Festival as one of 12 venues which had made the most important contributions to jazz music in the United Kingdom.
