= Dafydd Epynt =

Welsh poet

Dafydd Epynt was a 15th-century Welsh poet. It is thought he was from the Brecknock area. His works include a number of poems written to the gentry of his period, and others written to Christ, the Virgin Mary and St. Cynog (Cynog ap Brychan). Some of his surviving works are written in his own hand.
