= Hannibal (slave ship) =

The Hannibal was a slave ship, (or Guineaman) hired by the Royal African Company of England. The ship participated in two slave trading voyages, in the Triangular Trade. The wooden sailing ship was 450 tons and mounted with thirty-six guns. The ship is most remembered for her disastrous voyage of 1693–94. Captain Thomas Phillips commanded the Hannibal. He was a Welsh sea captain from Brecon, Wales who was employed by the Sir Jeffrey Jeffreys, and others. who owned the Hannibal and were governors and Assistants in the Royal African Company.

At the age of 28–29, Phillips undertook his first slave-trading expedition commanding a vessel. Approximately 328 (47 percent) of the 700 enslaved African women, men, and children aboard, as well as 36 crew members, lost their lives under his direct responsibility.

Seven hundred enslaved Africans were forced into her hold to sail to the slave-market in Barbados. Many slavers rigged shelves in the middle called a "slave deck" so that individuals could not sit upright during most of the voyage. Letters survive of Phillips writing on 8 September 1693, requesting that ‘the mast-makers of Deptford and Woolwich’ be ordered to work faster in fitting new platforms and that the blacksmiths have the same orders for ironwork. The owners of the ship, of which Phillips has a share, were paid a freight fee of £10.50p for every enslaved African they landed at Barbados alive. As a result, the enslaved African captives were fed regularly twice a day consisting mainly of corn, beans and pepper which was believed to prevent the white flux (dysentery). Phillips wrote that he purchased 1,000 oranges and other fruits on the island of São Tomé (St Thomas) for the slaves. The captives received a litre of water per day, and were forced to exercise up on deck for an hour every evening to keep them fit, also known as forced dancing. Despite these efforts, 47 per cent of the enslaved Africans died from dysentery, smallpox, physical injuries, starvation, dehydration and suicide on the Hannibal's voyage of 1693–1694.

== The voyage of 1693–1694 ==
The voyage began from London on 5 September 1693. On board were a crew of 70 plus 33 soldiers of the Royal African Company riding as passengers to the company's outposts on the West African coast. On 17 November Phillips discovered that one of the soldiers was a woman disguised as a man named John Brown. The discovery came about because the soldier became sick, requiring the services of the ship's surgeon, who prescribed an enema, which, according to Phillips, "when his mate went to administer, he was surpriz'd to find more sally-ports than he expected." The ship's tailor made her some woman's clothing, Phillips found her private lodging and she worked on the ship as a laundress until she was delivered to Cape Coast Castle in present-day Ghana. Phillips described her as a "likely black girl" about 20 years old.

On 23 November, after passing to the west of the Canary Islands, the Hannibal was intercepted by a French frigate. England had been at war with France since 1689 in a conflict that was to become known as the Nine Years' War. The two ships exchanged broadsides and musket fire until the French frigate lost a mast and withdrew. The Hannibal suffered considerable damage. Five crew members were killed and 32 wounded, including Phillips's 16-year-old brother, who would die of fever almost two months later, when the Hannibal had reached the coast of present-day Liberia.

Phillips sailed the Hannibal eastward along the Grain Coast, Ivory Coast, and Gold Coast, trading sporadically for gold, ivory, and provisions and visiting English and Dutch officers at various coastal forts there. In late January he began to suffer severe headaches. Fevers, weakness, and nausea plagued him for the rest of the voyage, occasionally leaving him bedridden. On 27 February he reached Cape Coast Castle, headquarters of the Royal African Company in West Africa. There he deposited the 30 soldiers and a good portion of his cargo, leaving on 25 April. On 20 May the ship arrived in Whydah (Ouidah), an African port located in modern-day Benin. Here 700 enslaved Africans were bartered for with goods carried from England.

Before boarding the ship the enslaved men were put in irons in pairs by their wrists and legs, and branded with a capital "H" on the breast to claim them for the Hannibal. The captives were rowed out the waiting ship a mile and a half off-shore. Only 5–6 persons could be rowed in the local canoes at one time. This meant that boarding 700 people took over a month.

Before heading for Barbados Phillips stopped at São Tomé on 12 August for provisions. He later would blame the illnesses that decimated his crew and cargo of slaves in part on the impure water and food he laid in there (particularly, when it came to his crew, the "unpurg'd black sugar, and raw unwholesome rum they bought there of which they drank in punch to great excess.")

The ship reached Barbados on 25 February 1694 with only 372 traumatised enslaved Africans remaining alive. Fourteen crew members and 320 slaves died since the ship left São Tomé. The enslaved Africans who died while on the voyage were dumped overboard during the voyage with no funeral rites. Some died of smallpox but the largest killer was an outbreak of dysentery. Others jumped overboard out of fear. Twelve committed suicide by jumping off the canoes as they were being rowed out to the waiting ship. Phillips writes in his journal that 12 slaves 'willfully drowned themselves' during the voyage, several others persistently refused food starving themselves to death, 'for it is their Belief that when they die they return to their own Country and Friends again.'

While Phillips was in Barbados the island suffered an epidemic of "plague" (probably yellow fever.) The Hannibal lost 18 crew members to this disease. Phillips was infected but he was able to make the trip back to England, though severely incapacitated. The Hannibal left Barbados on 3 May 1694 with a cargo of sugar, cotton and ginger. By the time the Hannibal reached the southern coast of England Phillips was bedridden with "violent convulsions in my head, together with a vertigo." He had lost his hearing in his right ear several months earlier and now he was completely deaf. His misfortunes were not over yet. On 1 June east of Beachy Head the ships's mate, who was drunk, caused a collision with another ship, causing so much damage the Hannibal had to be towed to Spithead. There Phillips delivered two chests of gold to agents of the Royal African Company.

Phillips only made one voyage as a slave trader and retired back to Brecon due to illness, probably Lassa Fever. There he lived in a town house known as Harvard House which he had inherited from his father, William Phillips. Phillips died in late 1712 or early 1713 and was buried at St Johns the Evangelist, now Brecon Cathedral.

During 2010 in the town of Brecon, Wales a controversial plaque was erected, by the then town council, at the expense of local tax payers without their consent. The plaque was commissioned to memorialise the life of Captain Thomas Phillips, slave trader and not to remember the 328 enslaved Africans who perished on his ship. During the worldwide riots following the murder of George Floyd, the plaque in memory to Captain Phillips was removed by an unknown person and thrown into the nearby river. The Town Council has promised and passed a resolution to display the plaque in context in Brecon Museum.

== The voyage of 1696–1697 ==
The Hannibal's next slave-trading voyage (and her last) was undertaken in 1696 under the command of Captain William Hill. This slaving voyage ended in a crew mutiny off the coast of Africa. Before Captain Hill was able to commence trading upon the coast and purchase 700 enslaved Africans at Whydah a crew mutiny occurred on board the ship, on 1 and 2 January 1697.

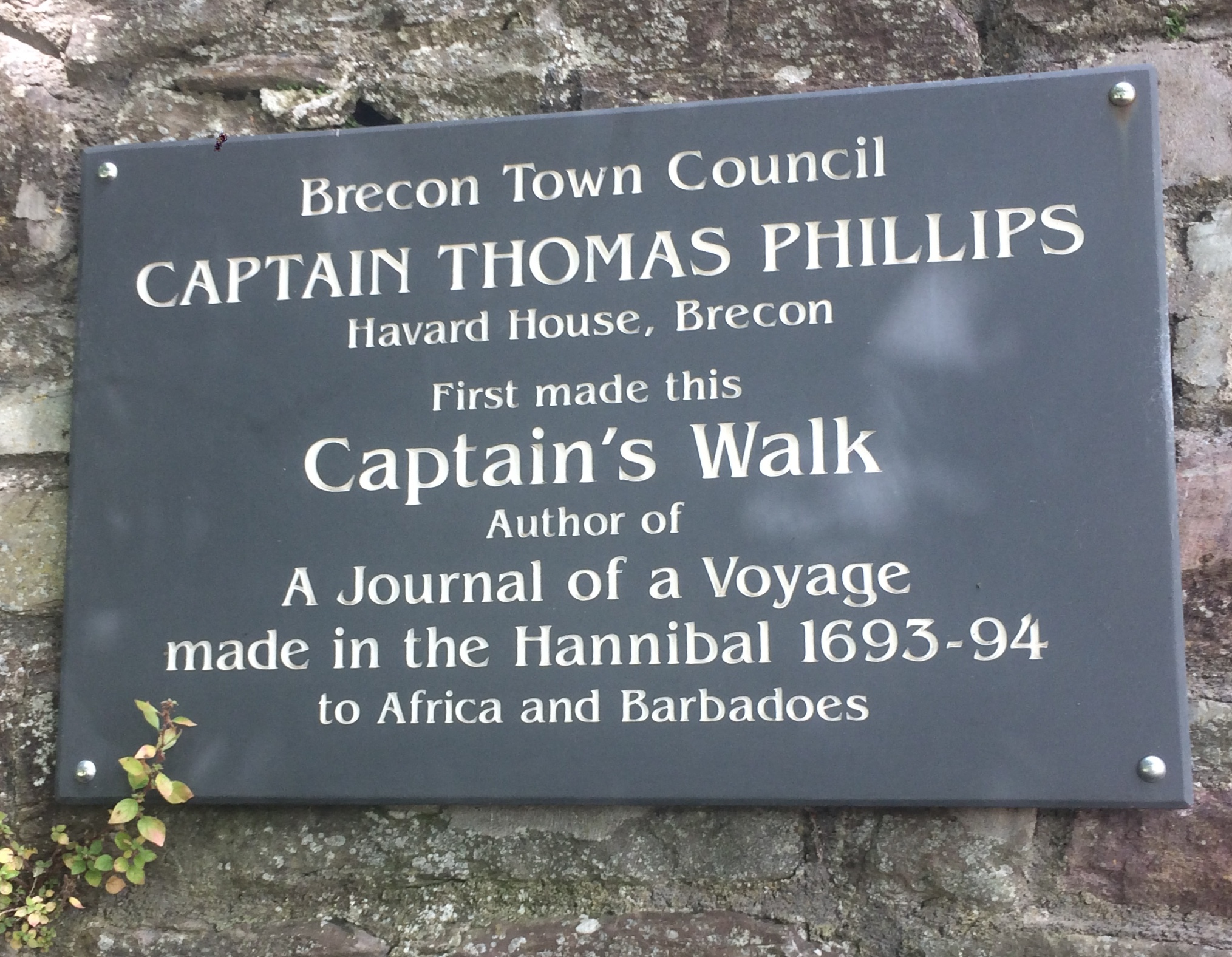
Controversial plaque to Captain Phillips a slave trader. Located in Brecon, Wales.
