= The Concorde Club =

Jazz club in Southampton, England

Coordinates: 50.9557°N 1.3715°W

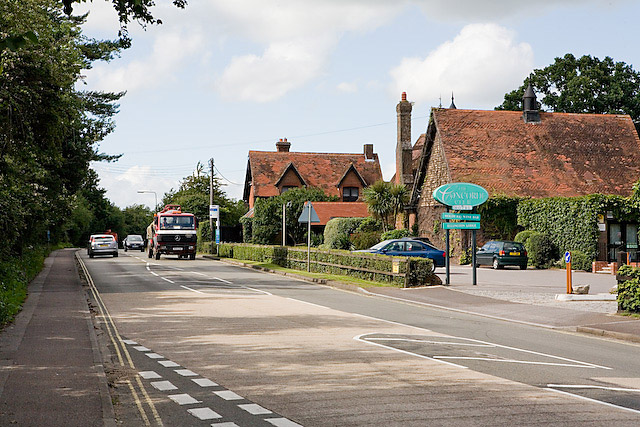
The Concorde Club, Stoneham Lane, Eastleigh.

The Concorde Club was launched in 1957 in Southampton by jazz aficionado Cole Mathieson, and is the oldest jazz club under the same management in the United Kingdom. Its standing in the UK jazz world has been recognised by the August 2009 award of the inaugural (Kind of) Blue Plaque, following a nationwide vote among jazz followers and musicians organised by the Brecon Jazz Festival. The award, celebrating the 50th anniversary of the Miles Davis classic album Kind of Blue, is to honour the jazz establishment considered to have done most for the development of jazz in the United Kingdom. On August 8 2012, the club celebrated its 55th anniversary with a concert featuring the Alan Barnes All Stars during which Barnes presented an illustrated history of the Concorde. He told the capacity crowd: "There are very few businesses, let alone a jazz club, run by the same person for 55 years. Cole has done more than most to promote jazz."

Mathieson, a former jazz drummer, started the Concorde in a converted restaurant at the back of the Bassett Hotel pub in Southampton in 1957, two years before Ronnie Scott launched his club in London. Among the major jazz musicians who played at the Concorde Club in the Bassett were American masters Coleman Hawkins, Ben Webster, Buck Clayton, Bud Freeman, Wild Bill Davison, and home-grown giants of the genre including Nat Gonella, Vic Ash, Tommy Whittle, Tubby Hayes, Joe Harriott, Kenny Baker, Tony Coe, Allan Ganley, plus the bands of Humphrey Lyttelton, Chris Barber, Acker Bilk, Kenny Ball and Alex Welsh.

The Concorde widened its tastes to take in rhythm and blues, called "a cousin of jazz" by Mathieson. The resident band in 1962 was the then unknown Manfred Mann, and other little-known artistes who made early appearances at the club included Eric Clapton, Robert Plant, Georgie Fame, Rod Stewart, Ginger Baker and Elton John when he was still known as Reg Dwight.

In 1970 the Concorde had to find a new home when the Bassett Hotel was turned into a steak house. Mathieson moved the club to a run-down Victorian-age schoolhouse in North Stoneham, near Eastleigh, Hampshire. During the following 30-plus years Mathieson slowly developed the Concorde into an all-round entertainment centre. The old schoolhouse has been enlarged to take in a restaurant, a wine bar (the Moldy Fig), a 300-seat concert venue and a 35-room hotel called the Ellington Lodge, with each room named after a jazzman who has featured at the club.

The club has a 4,500 membership, and a waiting list of hundreds. It now features tribute band nights, a wine society, corporate dinners and presentations, supper and dinner clubs, but jazz remains at the heart of the Concorde. A list of the jazz artistes regularly appearing there reads like a Who's Who of post-war jazz, including Sir John Dankworth, Dame Cleo Laine, Don Lusher, George Chisholm, Roy Budd, Digby Fairweather, Alan Barnes, Simon Spillett, Jamie Cullum and overseas stars of the calibre of Stephane Grapelli, Sonny Stitt, Ruby Braff, Barney Kessell, Maynard Ferguson, Scott Hamilton and Bud Shank. The Concorde has become a popular venue for a parade of leading female jazz singers including Clare Teal, Stacey Kent, Jacqui Dankworth and Rosemary Squires. The late Marion Montgomery was a regular singer at the Concorde, accompanied by her pianist husband Laurie Holloway who often returns to the club with his trio.

Cole Mathieson published his memoirs in the spring of 2008: The Concorde Club, the First 50 Years It has an introduction by Humphrey Lyttelton, who 'left the building' the day the book was due to go to press. Humph, who made his last appearance at the Concorde Club on 9 April 2008, signed off his introduction with his autograph accompanied by a caricature of himself. It was the last cartoon that Humph drew, and he agreed that it could be auctioned for charity, not realizing the full significance of it. His final cartoon raised £1,300 for the Wessex Cancer Trust.

== See also ==
- List of jazz clubs
