= St David's Church, Llanfaes =

Coordinates: 51.9449°N 3.4011°W

- Llanfaes Church
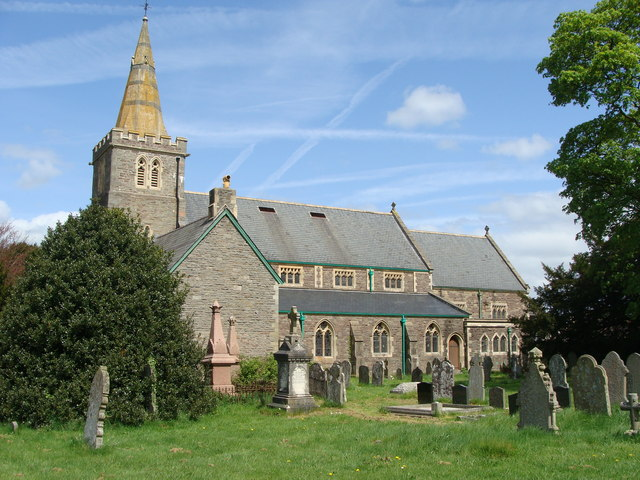
- St David's Church, Llanfaes
- Location: Brecon
- Country: Wales
- Denomination: Church in Wales

History
- Status: Parish church
- Dedication: St David of Wales

Architecture
- Functional status: Active
- Heritage designation: Grade II
- Architect: J. Clayton
- Style: Early Decorated Style
- Years built: 1859; rebuilt in 1923–5

Administration
- Diocese: Swansea and Brecon

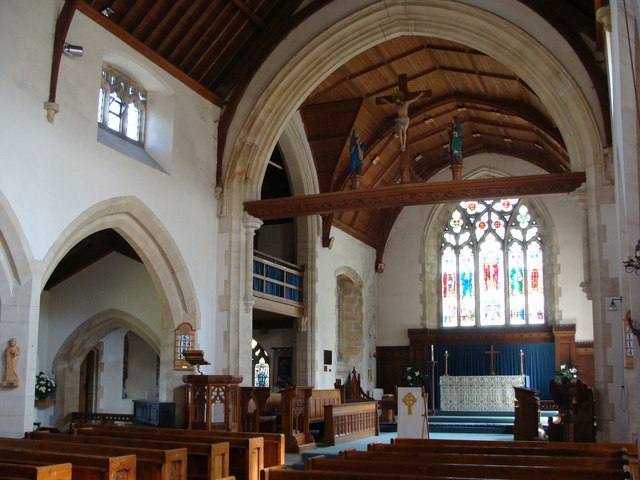
Interior

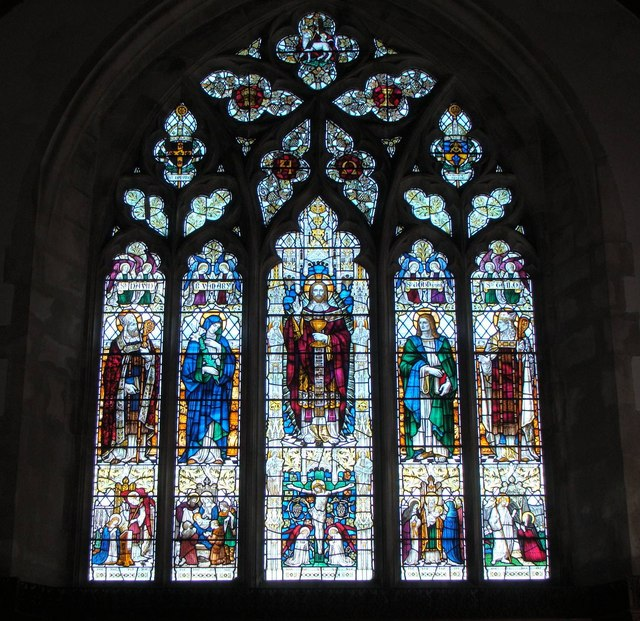
East window

St. David's Church (or Llanfaes Church; Llandewi yn y Maes [St. David's in the Field]) is located in Brecon, Powys, Mid Wales.

St. David's Church was reckoned in the time of Theophilus Jones to be situated in the suburbs of the town, though formerly it was situated in a field. The fabric consists of a chancel, nave, and a tower at the west end in which are six bells.

In the aisle and chancel there used to be several stones to the memory of departed: one to John ab Rees, of Penderrin (1621), Saunders John Thomas ab leuan Llwyd (1621), Edward Williams, of Ffrwdgrech (Ki67), Margaret, wife of Walter Watkins, of Brecknock, gent., and daughter and sole heiress of Watkin John, of Heolfanog (1700); David Lloyd, of Caerau (1727), his son Peter (1745), and his wife Magdalen (1742), and other stones to the Lloyds bearing the dates 1788, 1748, 1785. There is a tablet in the church to the memory of the Rev. Theo. Evans, of Llangammarch, who afterwards became vicar of St. David's. This church was last restored in 1859, at a cost of £1,500, and contains a memorial window given by the late Colonel and Mrs. Church Pearce, in memory of their son. In 1808 three-quarters of an acre of land was consecrated for burial ground purposes by the Bishop of St. David's. The parish register dates from the year 1780.

== Bibliography ==
- Poole, Edwin (1886). The Illustrated History and Biography of Brecknockshire: From the Earliest Times to the Present Day. Illustrated by Several Engravings and Portraits (Public domain ed.). Edwin Poole.
