= Gerard Cousins =

Welsh guitarist, composer and arranger (born 1974)

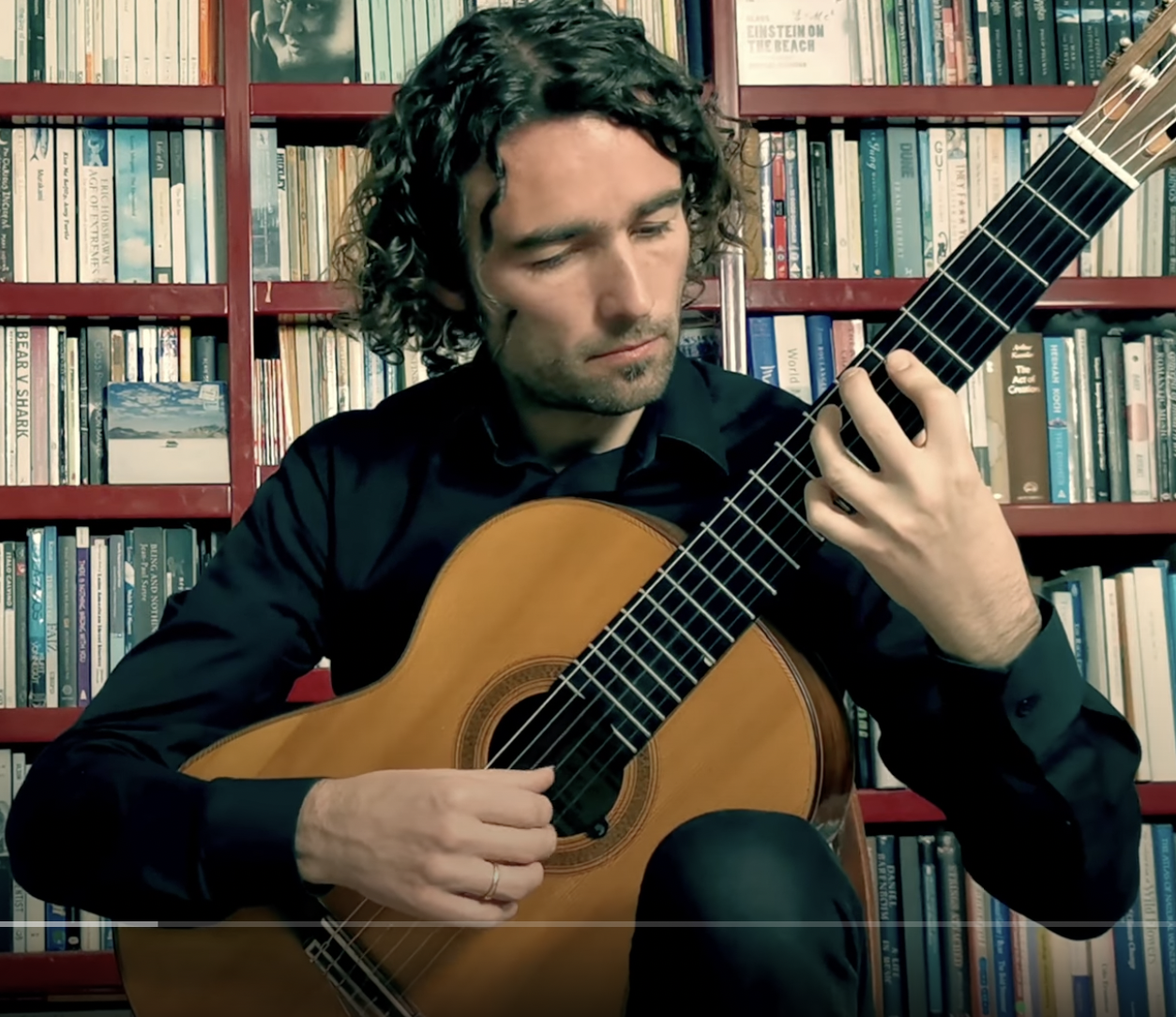
- Cousins in 2021

Background information
- Born: April 12, 1974 (age 52); Brecon, Wales
- Genres: Classical
- Occupations: Guitarist, composer, arranger
- Instrument: Guitar
- Label: Galles Music/Orange Mountain Music/Unquiet
- Website: http://www.gerardcousins.com

Gerard Cousins is a Welsh guitarist, composer and arranger.

== Biography ==
Gerard Cousins was born in Brecon and studied music at the University of Leeds and ARTEZ Conservatorium (Netherlands) where his principal composition teachers were Philip Wilby and David Rowland. He studied the guitar with Jeremy Herbert, Graham Wade and Louis Ignatius Gall.

Following the tradition of the performer/composer, Gerard Cousins has recorded and performed much of his own music. He has expanded the guitar repertoire with his own arrangements of traditional Welsh music and often works with contemporary composers arranging and recording their music for guitar. Most notably with Philip Glass and Eric Whitacre.

Radio France dedicated a show to Cousins' recordings of minimalist guitar music featuring his Philip Glass recordings and his own compositions.

Adam Walton dedicated an hour long show on BBC Wales to Cousins' music in 2015.

== Discography ==
=== Escape - Philip Glass ===
Track list:

Opening - Philip Glass*
Metamorphosis 1 - Philip Glass*
Escape - Philip Glass*
Metamorphosis 3 - Philip Glass*
Metamorphosis 5 - Philip Glass*
Knee Play Two - Philip Glass*
Truman Sleeps - Philip Glass*

- Arranged for the guitar by Gerard Cousins

=== Lullabies - The Music of Eric Whitacre ===
Track list:

Goodnight Moon - Eric Whitacre*
Sing Gently - Eric Whitacre*
The Seal Lullaby - Eric Whitacre*
This Marriage - Eric Whitacre*

- Arranged for the guitar by Gerard Cousins

=== Una Leyenda ===
Track list:

Sonatina - Federico Moreno Torroba
Una Leyenda - Pedro Sanjuan
Tiento Antiguo - Joaquin Rodrigo
Capricho Arabe - Francisco Tarrega
Un Tiempo fue Italica Famosa - Joaquin Rodrigo
El testament d'Amelia - Miguel Llobet
Canco de Lladre - Miguel Llobet
El noi de la Mare - Miguel Llobet
Sonata - Antonio Jose
Romance de los Pinos - Federico Moreno Torroba

=== A Gift ===
Track list:

Wind Color Vector - Takashi Yoshimatsu
Canticle (from Around the Round Ground) - Takashi Yoshimatsu
Elystan - Gerard Cousins
Viaje a la Semilla - Leo Brouwer
July 18 - Gerard Cousins
A Gift - Robert Jacob
Chant - John Tavener
Hika in Memorium Toru Takemitsu - Leo Brouwer
Tune for Toru - Mark-Anthony Turnage arr. Gerard Cousins

=== Hiraeth - Celtic Guitar Music from Wales ===
Track list:

Tros y Garreg (Crossing the Stone) - Trad.*
Gwahoddiad (Arglwydd Dyma Fi) - Trad.*
Fantasia on Ar Lan Y Mor - Trad.*
Dafydd y Garreg Wen (David of the White Rock) - Trad.*
Hiraeth - Grace Williams* (1906-1977)
Amanda's Delight (from 2 pieces for guitar) - Robert Smith
A Short Verse for Edward Thornburgh - Thomas Tomkins* (1572- 1656)
A Sad Pavan Forbidding Mourning - Hilary Tann (b. 1947)
Olwyn Ddwr (Water Wheel) - Gareth Glyn* (b. 1951)
Crossing Water Alone - Simon Thorne* (b. 1954)
Teifi's Dream (Hen Wlad Fy Nhadau) - Trad.*

- Arranged for the guitar by Gerard Cousins

=== The First Beat is the Last Sound ===
Track list:

Assyrian Game - Gerard Cousins
Ripening Prelude - Gerard Cousins
Lisa Lan - Gerard Cousins
Suo Gan (Variations and Toccata on a Welsh Lullaby) - Gerard Cousins
In the Grip part 1 (homage to Philip Glass) - Gerard Cousins
White Cloud Blue Sky (homage to John McLaughlin) - Gerard Cousins
Cantus Tintinnabulous (homage to Arvo Part) - Gerard Cousins
In the Grip part 2 - Gerard Cousins
The Sound of One Hand Clapping (homage to Steve Reich) - Gerard Cousins
Minimi (for 2 guitars) - Gerard Cousins
This Marriage - Eric Whitacre (arranged by Gerard Cousins)

== Podcasts ==
Gerard Cousins has been interviewed on "The Next Track" and "Guitaronamie" podcasts.
