= Brecon Jazz Festival =

Music festival

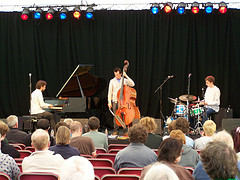
Tom Cawley's Curios at Brecon Jazz 2008

The Brecon Jazz Festival is a music festival held annually in Brecon, Wales. Normally staged in early August, it has played host to a range of jazz musicians from across the world.

Created in 1984 by local enthusiasts – musicians, promoters and fans – the early festival featured live jazz music on the streets and in the pubs and cafes of Brecon. It was a community event originally created by the town's residents, modelled on New Orleans-style jazz events. Jed Williams as president of the Welsh Jazz Society, and founding editor of the Cardiff-based magazine Jazz UK had many international connections and was involved since 1984, working with local organisers including Liz Elston and Tony Constantinescu. George Melly, who had a house close by, and was a friend of Tony Constantinescu, performed the following year after the success of the first festival. Since 2016 the festival has been directed and presented by the Brecon Jazz stakeholders coordination group, founded by members of the local jazz club. Assets and historic rights to the festival are held by Brecon Jazz Festival Ltd and Friends of Brecon Jazz on behalf of the town of Brecon.

As well as the main festival, a Brecon Fringe is organised as alternative free music in pubs, hotels, galleries and cafes in the town.

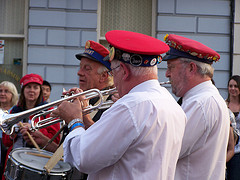
Adamant Jazz Band on the opening evening of Brecon 2008

== Jazz musicians at Brecon ==
Jazz musicians who have performed at the Brecon Jazz Festival.

1984 Humphrey Lyttelton, George Melly, Bruce Turner, John Barnes
1985 Jan Garbarek, Slim Gaillard, Stan Tracey, Ken Colyer
1986 Al Grey, Buddy Tate, George Chisholm, Dudu Pukwana, Blanche Finlay
1987 Joe Henderson, Helen Shapiro, Woody Shaw, Pasadena Roof Orchestra
1988 Lee Konitz, Humphrey Lyttelton, Slim Gaillard, Louisiana Red
1989 Sonny Rollins, Jimmy Giuffre, George Melly
1990 Humphrey Lyttelton, Sun Ra, Scott Hamilton (musician)
1991 Gerry Mulligan, Ruby Braff, Joe Pass
1992 Michel Petrucciani, Johnny Griffin, Pat Metheny, Courtney Pine
1993 Lionel Hampton, Stéphane Grappelli, Wynton Marsalis, Hank Jones, McCoy Tyner
1994 Benny Carter, George Shearing, Slide Hampton, Ray Brown
1995 Cleo Laine, Toots Thielemans, Kenny Barron, McCoy Tyner
1996 Van Morrison, Joshua Redman, Phil Woods, Charles Brown
1997 Milt Jackson, Hank Jones, Courtney Pine, Diana Krall
1998 Branford Marsalis, Van Morrison, Michel Petrucciani, Ahmad Jamal
1999 Ruby Braff, Stan Tracey
2000 Wayne Krantz, Kenny Barron, Scott Hamilton
2001 Van Morrison, Joshua Redman, Dianne Reeves
2002 Courtney Pine, Scott Hamilton, McCoy Tyner
2003 Michael Brecker, Humphrey Lyttelton, George Melly, Richard Galliano
2004 Amy Winehouse, Humphrey Lyttelton, George Melly
2005 Phil Woods, Peter King, Jon Faddis, Marty Grosz
2006 Stan Tracey, Kirk Lightsey, Gwilym Simcock
2007 Catrin Finch, Mulgrew Miller, Joe Lovano, Jools Holland
2008 Joan Armatrading, Cerys Matthews, Courtney Pine
2009 Anouar Brahem, Manu Dibango, Abdullah Ibrahim
2010 Hugh Masekela, Orquesta Buena Vista Social Club, Hypnotic Brass Ensemble
2011 Allen Toussaint, Femi Kuti, Monty Alexander, Courtney Pine
2012 Dionne Warwick, Roy Ayres, Soweto Kinch, Brecon Jazz Club Events
2013 Jools Holland, Courtney Pine, Mavis Staples, Brecon Jazz Club Events
2014 Laura Mvula, Gregory Porter, Loose Tubes, Brecon Jazz Club Events
2015 Robert Glasper, Phronesis, GoGo Penguin, Brecon Jazz Club Events
2016 Tina May, Jacqui Dankworth, Dennis Rollins, Nerija, Asterope, Capital City Jazz Orchestra, Geoff Eales, Brownfield Byrne, Trish Clowes.
2017 Darius Brubeck , Nigel Price, Atsuko Shimada, Rod Paton, Gerard Cousins
2018 Elaine Delmar , Maite Hontelé, Ian Shaw, Jim Hart, Adam Glasser, Byron Wallen
2019 Barbara Dennerlein , Stochelo Rosenberg, Scott Hamilton, Liane Carole, Karen Sharpe
2020 virtual Steve Lehman, Toni Kofi, Deelee Dubé, Xhosa Cole, Bryan Corbett
2021 hybrid Regina Carter, Huw Warren, Joanna Eden, Paula Gardiner, Art Themen
2022 Joan Chamorro, Simon Spillett, Claire Teal, Charlotte Glasson, Monmouth Big Band
2023 Emma Rawicz, The Louis and Ella Music Show, Faith I Branko, Lavon Hardison
2026 Courtney Pine, Tomos Williams, Caerphilly Male Voice Choir

== (Kind of) Blue Plaque ==
In 2009, in honour of the 50th anniversary of the release of the Miles Davis album Kind of Blue (1959), the festival invited jazz fans to submit nomination for an award, in the form of a Blue plaque to be awarded annually, the first to be bestowed in 2010, honouring the venues that had made the most significant contribution to jazz in the United Kingdom. Twelve nominees were selected:

- The Four Bars Inn (now Dempseys), Castle Street, Cardiff, 1987–present.
- Band on the Wall, Swann Street, Manchester, 1970s–present
- The Perch, Binsey Lane, Binsey 1928–1948.
- Buckingham Palace, London, 1919–1932.
- The Old Duke, King Street, Bristol, late 1960s–present.
- The Concorde Club, Eastleigh, Hampshire, 1957–present.
- The Feldman Swing Club, Oxford Street, London, 1942–1954.
- Ronnie Scott's, Frith Street, London, 1959–present.
- The Bull's Head, Barnes, south-west London, 1959–present.
- Hippodrome, Cranbourn Street, London, 1900–1983.
- Hammersmith Palais, London, 1919–2007.
- Club Eleven, Windmill Street, then Carnaby Street, London, 1948–1950.

The Concorde Club received the most votes in the initial voting, followed by The Band on the Wall and Ronnie Scott's, and will receive the initial (Kind of) Blue Plaque.

== Ticket information ==
Programmes of music over the festival weekend have included:

Free music open to everyone, performed on the bandstand or pop-up locations in the centre of Brecon and on streets closed off to traffic for the festival weekend.

The Stroller Programme, requiring the purchase of a "stroller ticket", with acts from the mainly British jazz scene performing in smaller indoor and larger outdoor venues.

The Concert Programme showcasing major acts with an international profile. Every concert requires an individual ticket.

== Accommodation ==
Camping is popular at the festival, with two official campsites open to ticket holders and several independent campsites in the Brecon area. Hotels and bed and breakfasts are also available, but high demand usually means that early booking is required.
