= Dhampus =

Dhampus धम्पुस
- Village Development Committee
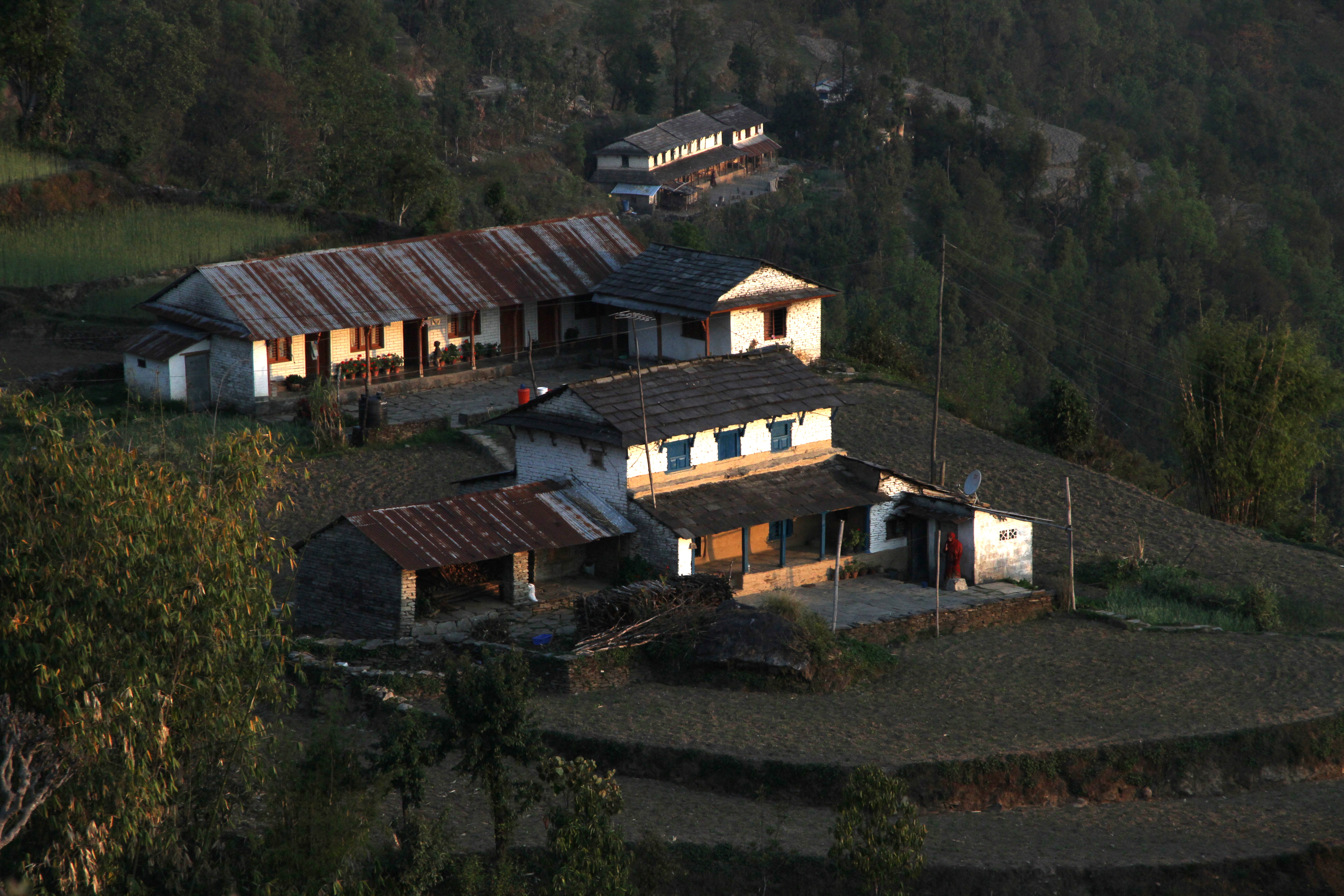
- Early morning in Dhampus

- Location in Nepal Dhampus (Nepal)
- Coordinates: 28.31°N 83.85°E
- Country: Nepal
- Zone: Gandaki Zone
- District: Kaski District

Population (1991)
  - Total: 2,753
- Time zone: UTC+5:45 (Nepal Time)

Dhampus is a village and Village Development Committee in Kaski District in the Gandaki Zone of northern-central Nepal. The village is located 19 km away from the Pokhara Baglung Highways and falls within the trekking route of Mardi Himal Trek. At the 1991 Nepal census, it had a population of 2,753 persons in 547 individual households. The village is gradually turning into a tourist destination. It has the Australian Base Camp with views of the peaks Annapurna, Dhaulagiri and Machhapuchhre.

== Gallery ==
Dhampus

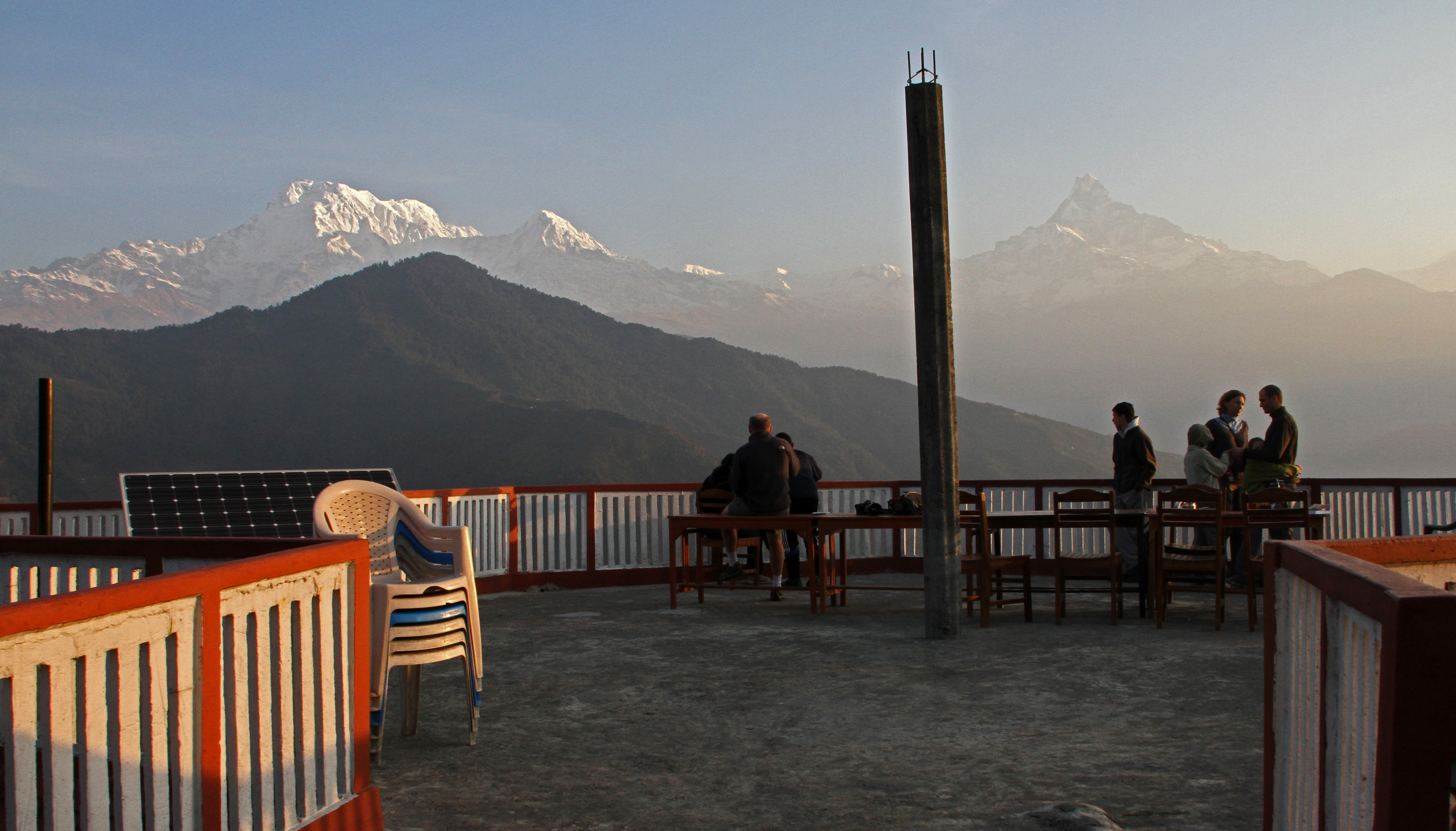
Annapurna-Hiunchuli-Machhapuchhre

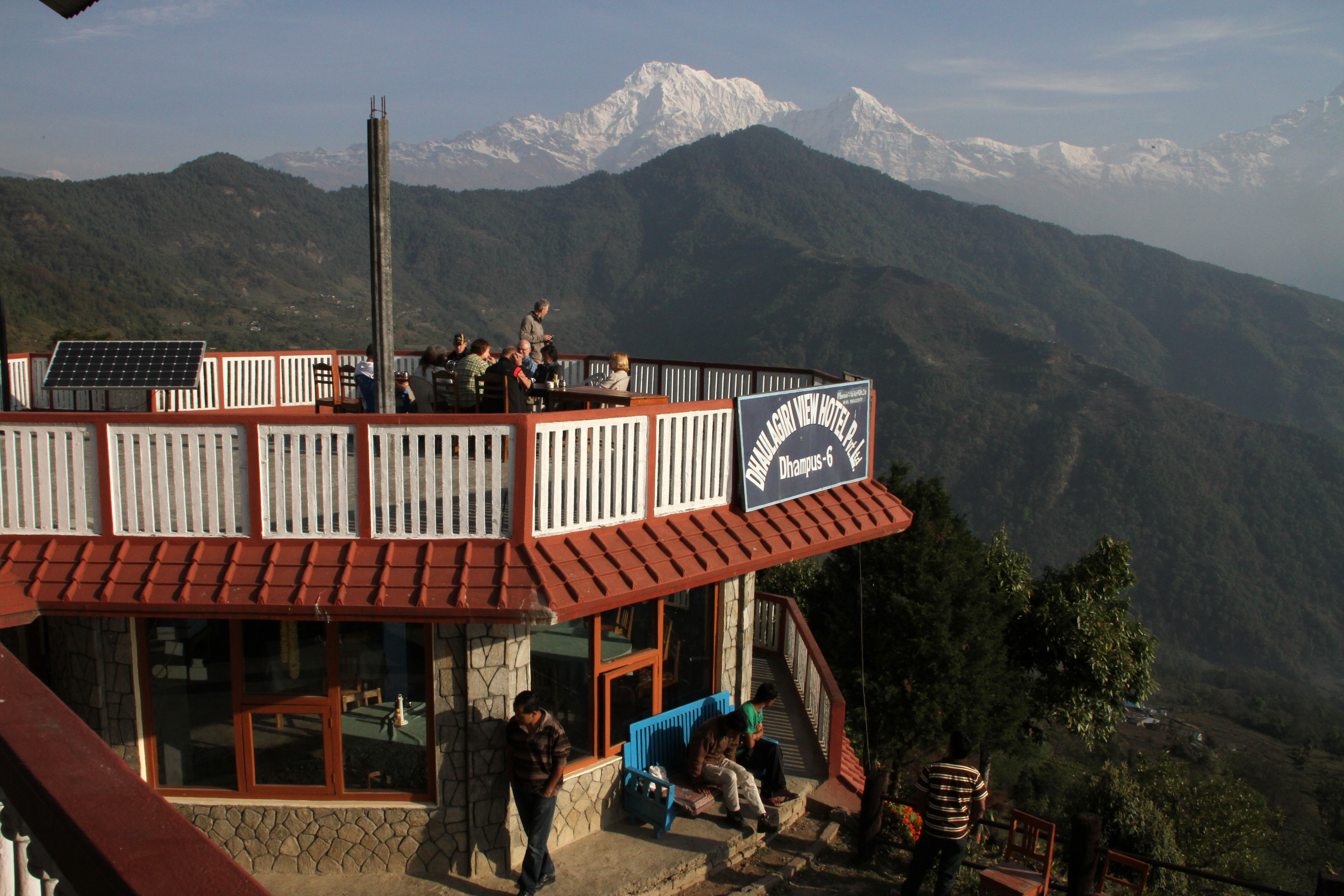
Breakfast view of Annapurna and Hiunchuli

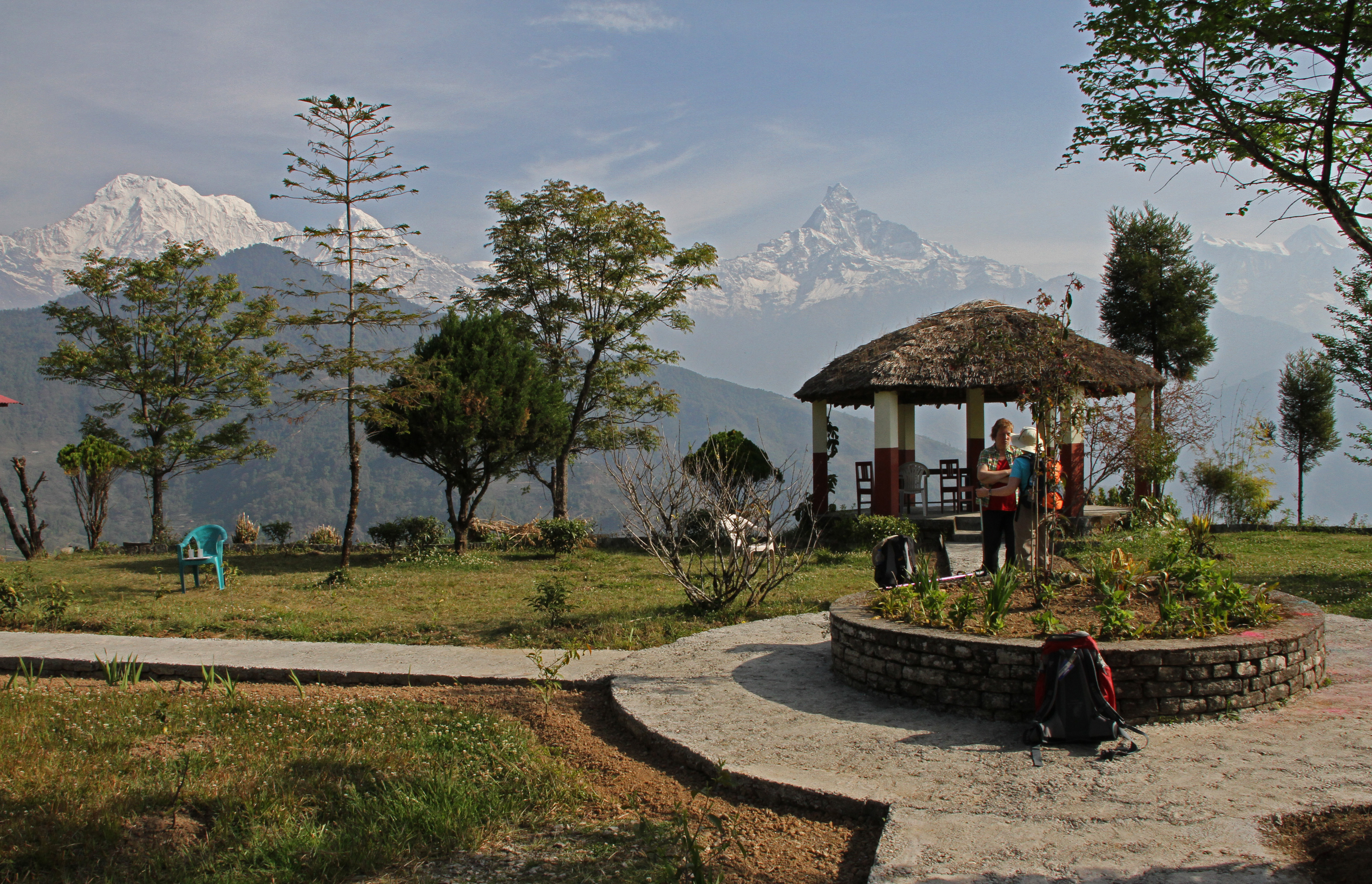
Hotel pavillon

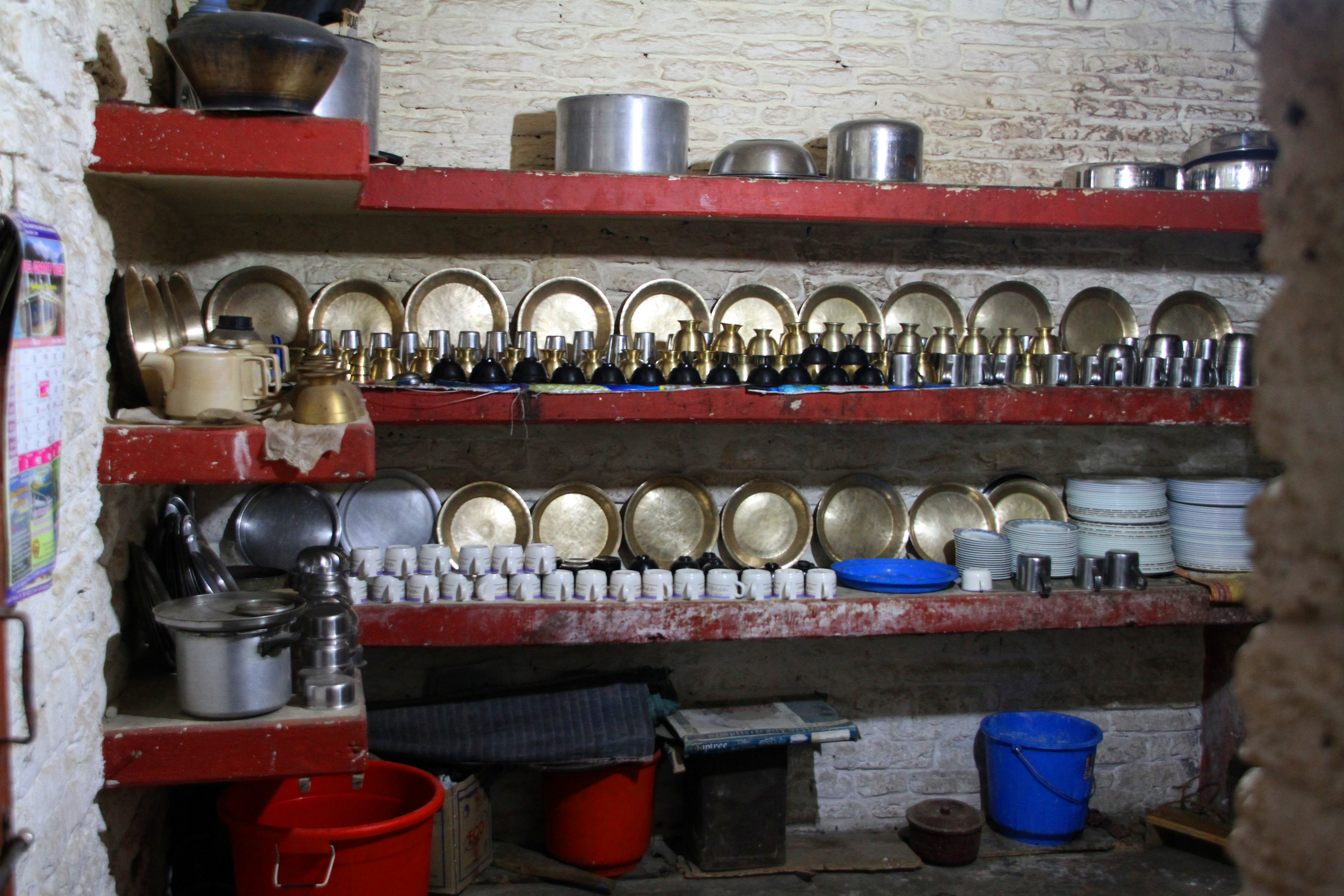
Hotel kitchen

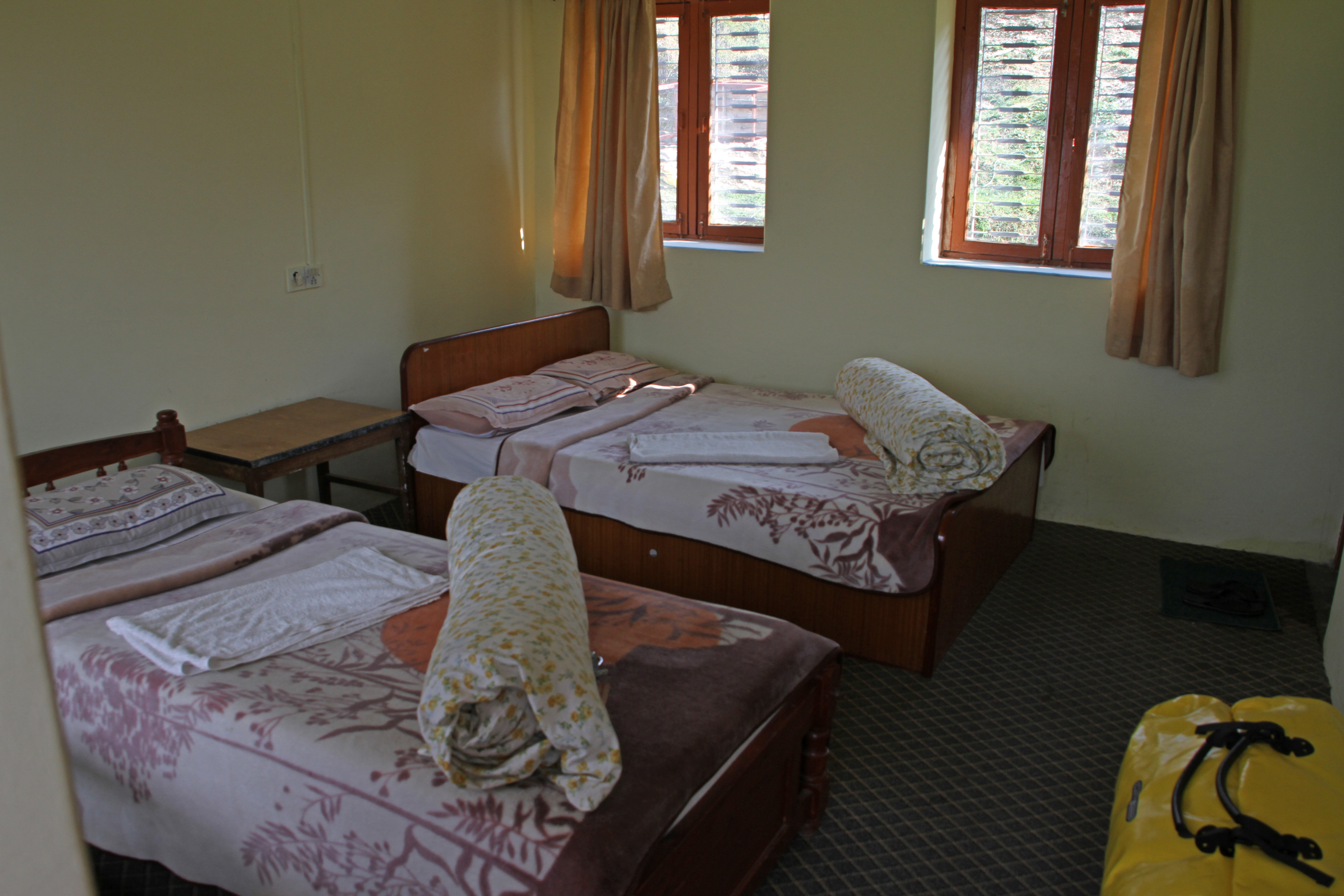
Hotel room

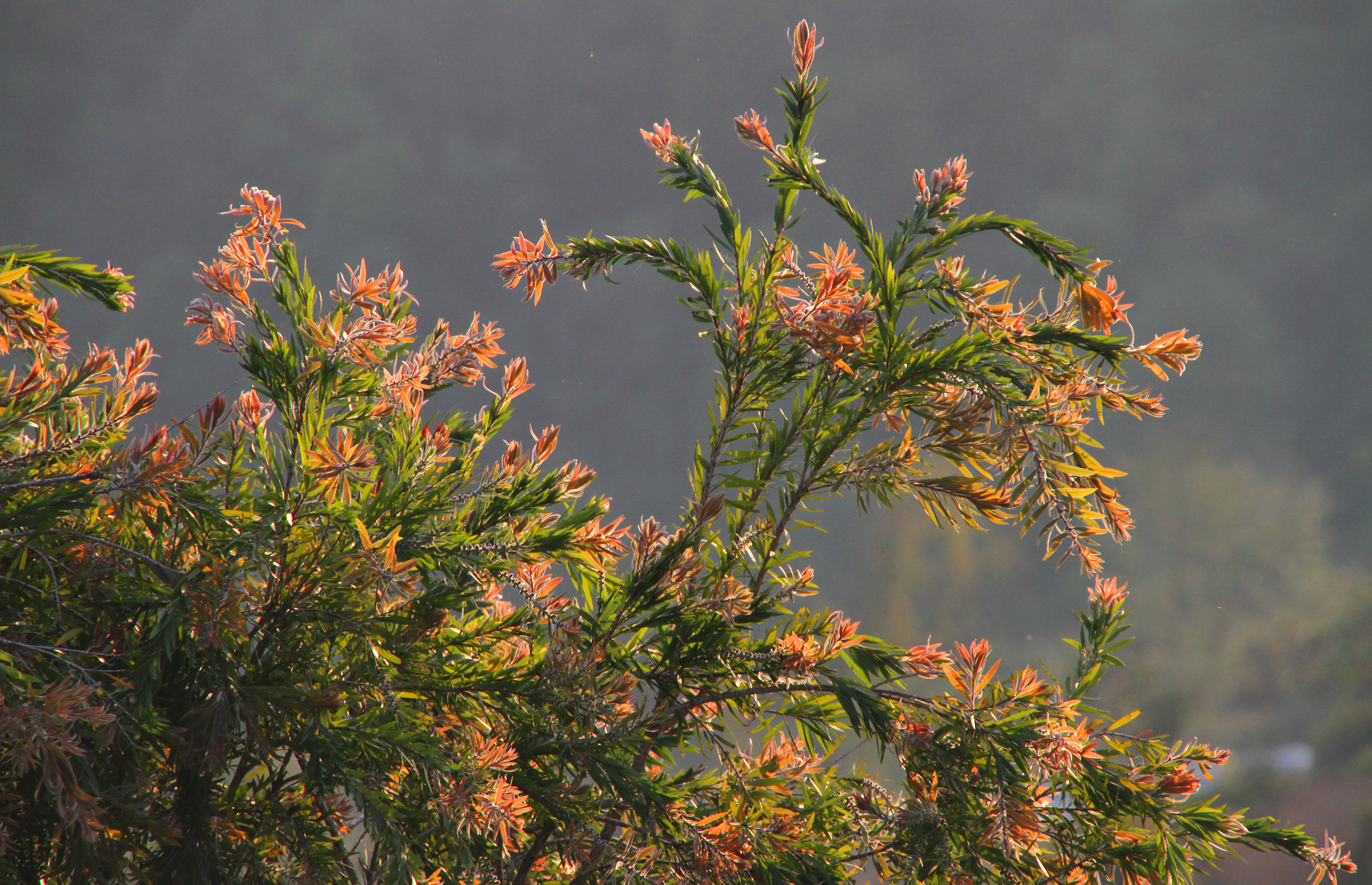
Morning light catcher

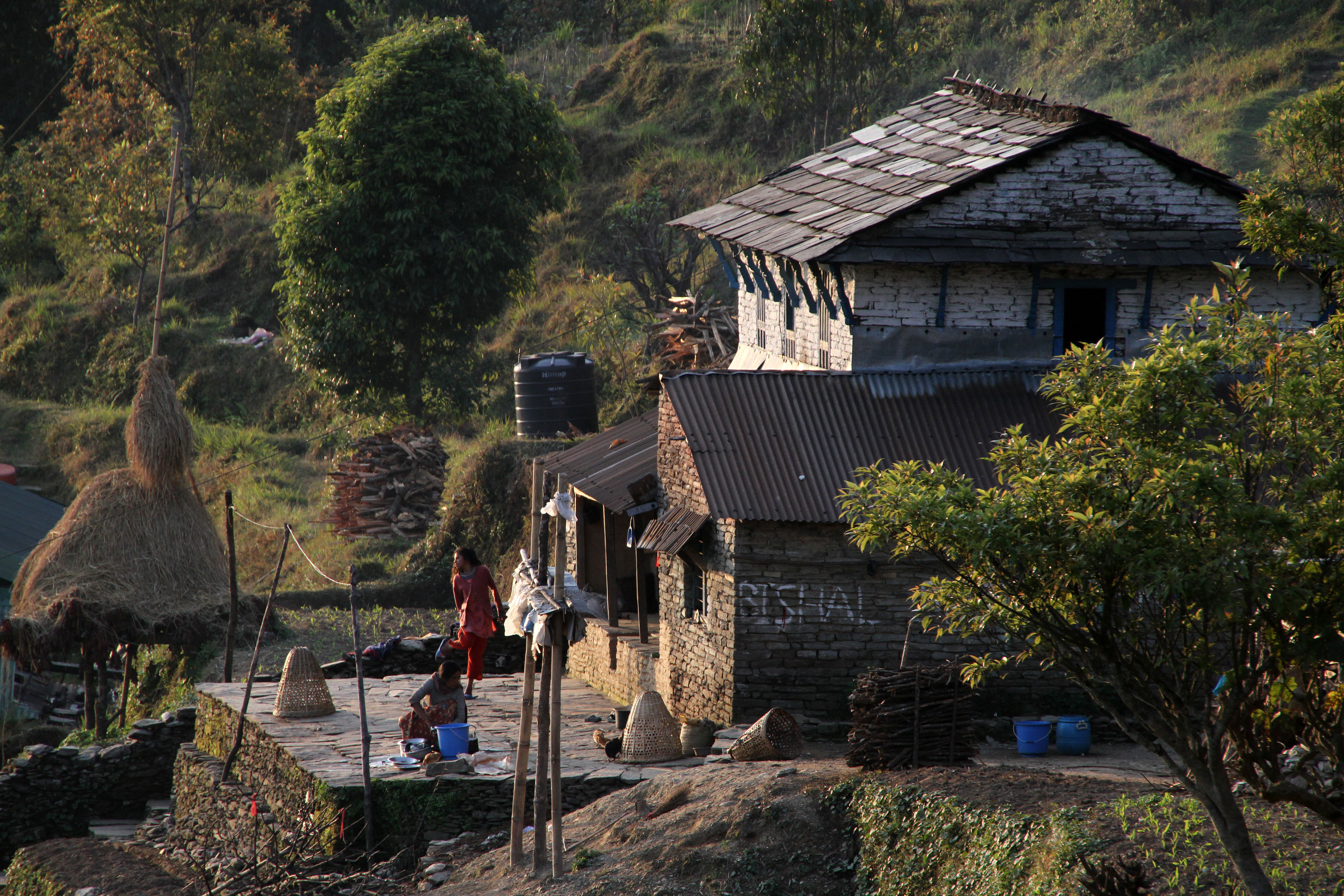
Farm house

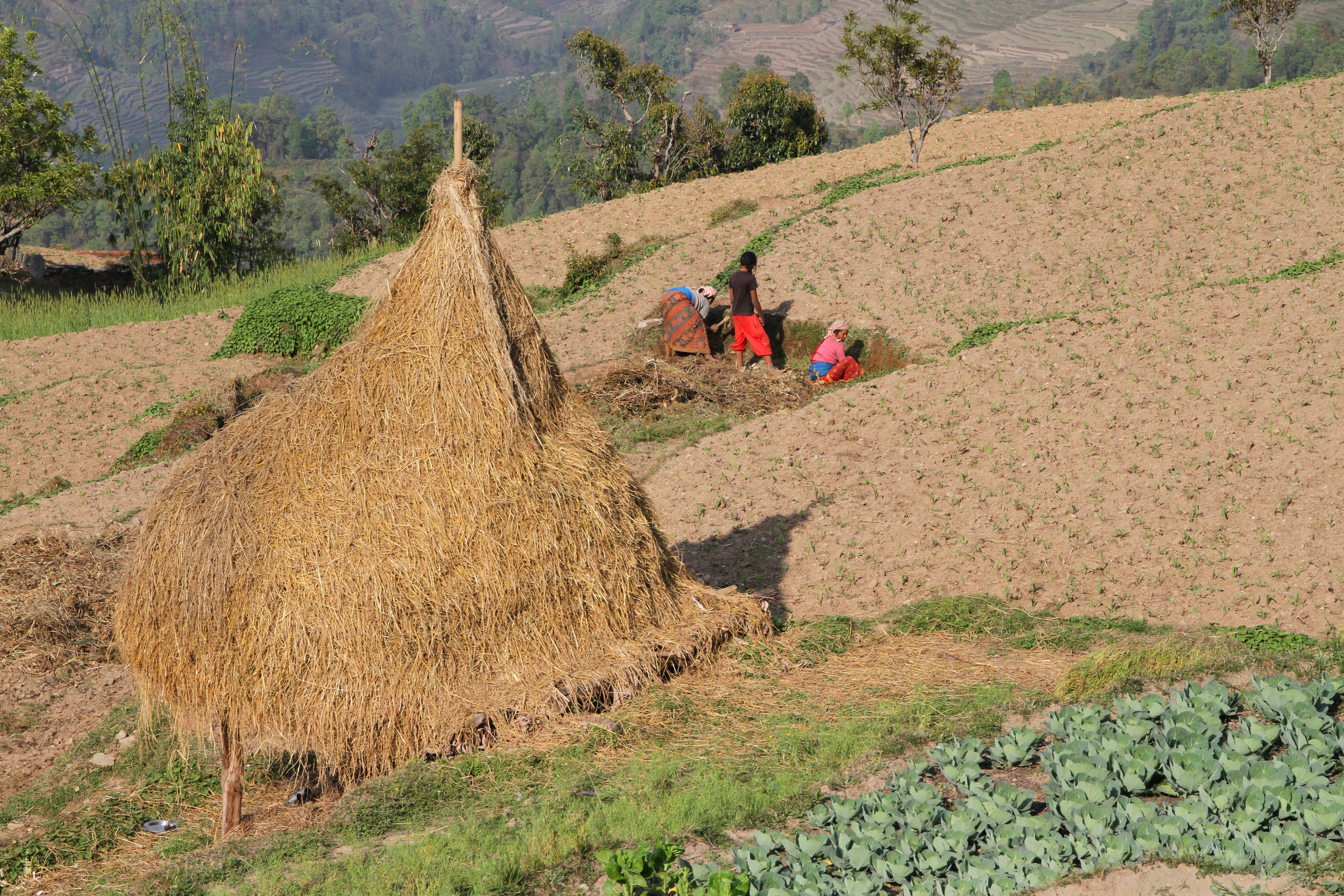
Fields around Dhampus
