= Roy Ayres =

American musician (1929–2012)

Roy Ayres (December 10, 1929 – June 9, 2012) was an American pedal steel guitar player.

A Grand Ole Opry musician known for full chords and smooth tone, Ayres played steel guitar on all of Pee Wee King’s major hits, including “The Tennessee Waltz”. He recorded with scores of King Records artists and played steel guitar in the Durango Kid western series. He was also a member of the 1950s band Boyd Bennett and his Rockets.

He was inducted into the Pioneers of Western Swing Hall of Fame in 2005 and the Western Swing Music Hall of Fame in 2006. In 2007, he was the 57th inductee into the International Steel Guitar Hall of Fame.

Ayres was born in 1929, in Columbus, Mississippi. He has a master's degree in physics and was Director of String Instrument Development at Fender Musical Instruments Corporation.

He later resided in Riverview, Florida, with his wife, Laurie. He died on June 9, 2012, at the age of 82.
