= The Brecon County Times =

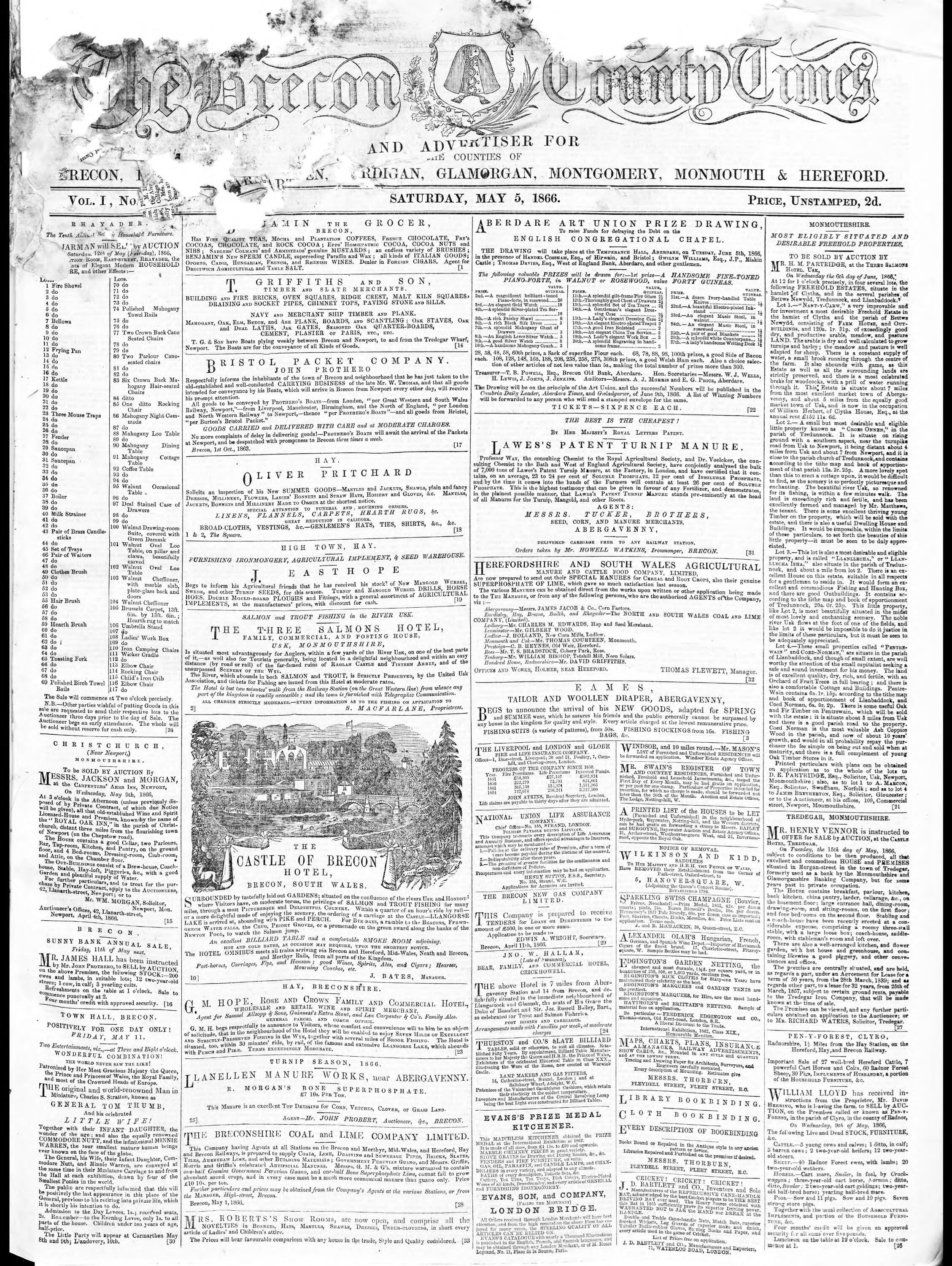
- The Brecon County Times, 5 May 1866
- Founder(s): William Clark
- Political alignment: Conservative
- Language: English

The Brecon County Times (established by William Clark) was a weekly English-language newspaper, with a Conservative bias, published in Wales. It was distributed around Breconshire, Monmouthshire, Radnorshire, Glamorgan and Herefordshire. It was the oldest newspaper printed in the Breconshire. It contained local and general news from around the county. Associated publication: Brecon and Radnor County Times.
