= Lisa Lân =

Welsh folk song

"Lisa Lân" (Fair Lisa) is a Welsh folk song. It is perhaps the most widespread of all Welsh folk songs, and there are many variants. It is a lover's lament for Lisa, ending when the heartsick lover asks dead Lisa to guide him to where she is, so that he may be reunited with her.

== Lyrics ==
Bûm yn dy garu lawer gwaith
Do lawer awr mewn mwynder maith
Bûm yn dy gusanu Lisa gêl
Yr oedd dy gwmni'n well na'r mêl.

Fy nghangen lân, fy nghowlad glyd
Tydi yw'r lanaf yn y byd
Tydi sy'n peri poen a chri
A thi sy'n dwyn fy mywyd i.

Pan fyddai'n rhodio gyda'r dydd
Fy nghalon fach sy'n mynd yn brudd
Wrth glywed sŵn yr adar mân
Daw hiraeth mawr am Lisa Lân.

Pan fyddai'n rhodio gyda'r hwyr
Fy nghalon fach a dôdd fel cwyr
Wrth glywed sŵn yr adar mân
Daw hiraeth mawr am Lisa lân.

Lisa, a ddoi di i'm danfon i
I roi fy nghorff mewn daear ddu?
Gobeithio doi di, f'annwyl ffrind
Hyd lan y bedd, lle'r wyf yn mynd.

Literal translation

I have loved you many times
Yes many an hour in prolonged tenderness
I have kissed you mysterious Lisa
And your company was better than honey.

My pure bough, my warm embrace
You are the purest in the world
You cause pain and anguish
And it is you who steals my life.

When I stroll during the day
My little heart becomes sad
On hearing the sound of the little birds
I feel great longing for fair Lisa.

When I stroll at nightfall
My little heart melts like wax
On hearing the sound of the little birds
I feel great longing for fair Lisa.

Lisa will you escort me
To place my body in black earth?
I hope you will come, my dear friend
To the graveside where I am going.

Free translation

Full many a time I came to woo,
Oft, Lisa I came a courting you;
I kissed your lips when we did meet,
No honey ever was so sweet

My dainty branch, my only dear,
No woman comes your beauty near;
'Tis you who with my passion play
'Tis you who steals my life away

When I go walking through the day,
My lovesick heart will turn to clay,
And but to hear the small birds sing,
The longing to my soul will bring

When'er at eve I walk apart,
Like wax will melt my lovesick heart,
And but to hear the small birds sing,
The longing to my soul will bring

Ah, will you come to bid good-bye,
When in the earth my form must lie?
I hope you too will there be found,
When men shall lay me in the ground.

== Cultural references ==
The English composer Gustav Holst arranged this song in 1930–1931 for his collection 12 Welsh Folk Songs for mixed chorus.

The song's melody is an instrumental theme throughout Paul Haggis's 2004 film Crash and an extract of the song itself is featured at the film's climax.
