= The Humph Trust =

The Humph Trust was established in the name of British jazz musician Humphrey Lyttelton to raise money for young jazz musicians.

Stephen Lyttelton son of the musician, started the trust on 25 April 2010 with A Celebration Concert at the HMV Apollo, London. The concert included the Humphrey Lyttelton Band with Wally Fawkes (clarinet), Eddie Taylor (drums), Karen Sharp (saxophone), John Barnes (tenor saxophone), John Picard (trombone), and Eddie Harvey (piano). Guest singers and musicians included Elkie Brooks, Jools Holland, Stacey Kent, Jim Tomlinson, Charlie Watts, Acker Bilk, Kenny Ball, Tina May, Louise Parker, Annie Whitehead, Sue Richardson, Ben Waters, and Axel Zwingelberger. The show presented comedy by Jack Dee, Barry Cryer, Tim Brooke-Taylor, Graeme Garden, Rob Brydon, Jeremy Hardy, Sandi Toksvig, Tony Hawks, Andy Hamilton, and Colin Sell from the BBC panel show I'm Sorry I Haven't a Clue. A recording was broadcast by BBC Radio 4 on Boxing Day 2010.

The Humph Award (originally The Humphrey Lyttelton Royal Academy of Music Jazz Award) was established with the Royal Academy of Music and is awarded annually to a student from the Academy's Jazz Department. Trumpeter Tom Walsh was the inaugural recipient of The Humph Award and began The Celebration Concert with his quartet playing "Song for My Father" by Horace Silver.

The Humph Award winner in 2011 was Nadim Teimoori. As part of his award he played with The Humphrey Lyttelton Band at Ronnie Scott's Jazz Club.

The trust was dissolved in 2015.

== Award winners ==
Award winners are:

- 2010: Tom Walsh
- 2011: Nadim Teimoori
- 2012: Sam Watts
- 2013: Scott Chapman
