= Good Days (disambiguation) =

"Good Days" is a 2020 song by SZA.

Good Days may also refer to:

- "Good Days", a 2018 song by Keshi
- "Good Days", a 2021 song by Now United and the Bootcampers
- "Good Days", a song by the Cairos from the 2014 album Dream of Reason
- "Good Days", a song by Young Rising Sons from the 2022 album Still Point in a Turning World
- Good Days (Chicago Underground Quartet album), 2020
- Good Days (Lenka album), 2026

== See also ==
- Good Day (disambiguation)
- Good Old Days (disambiguation)
