= Pardon Us =

1931 film

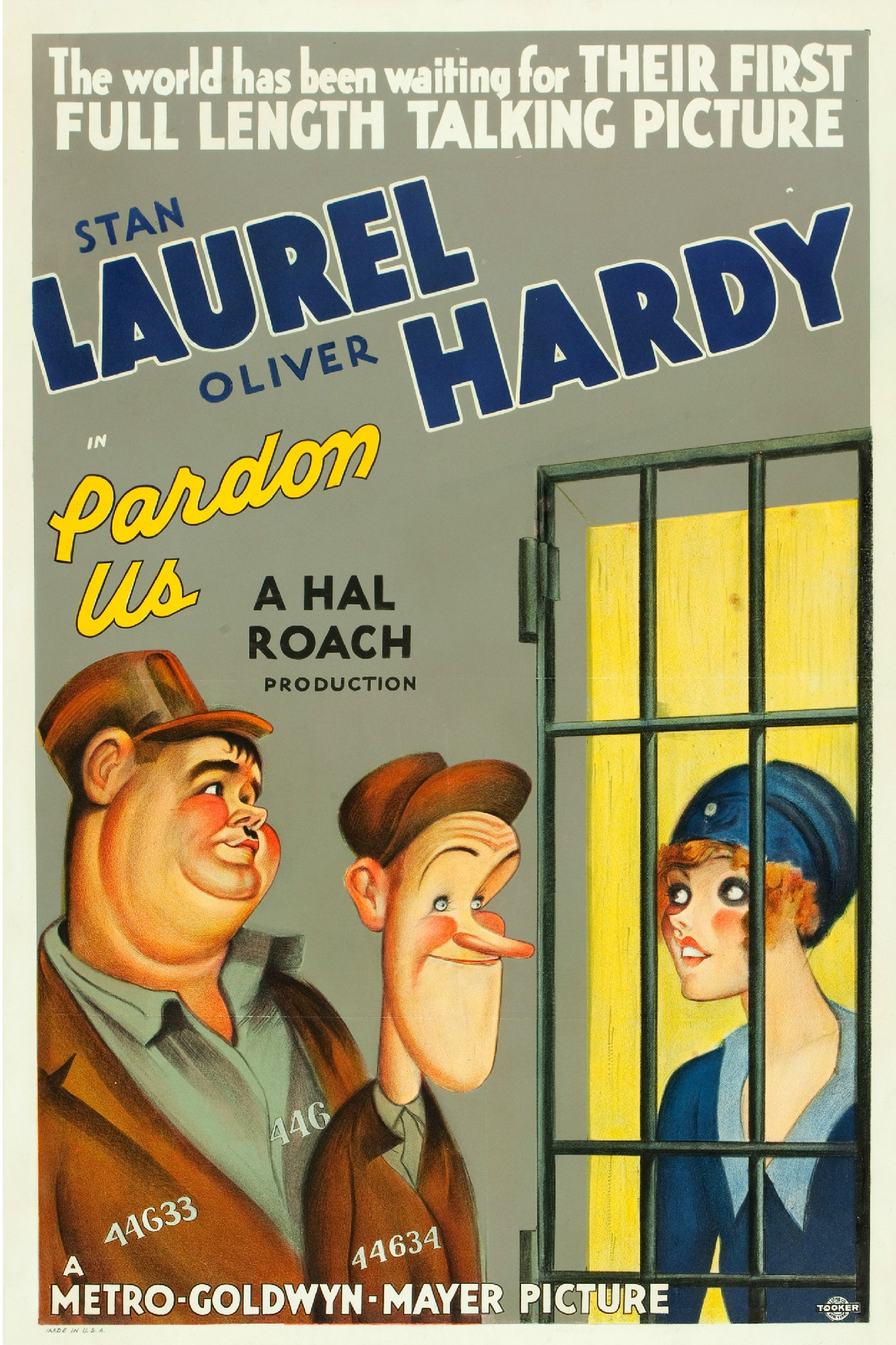
- Theatrical release poster
- Directed by: James Parrott
- Written by: H.M. Walker
- Produced by: Hal Roach
- Starring: Stan Laurel; Oliver Hardy
- Cinematography: Jack Stevens
- Edited by: Richard C. Currier
- Music by: Leroy Shield
- Production company: Hal Roach Studios
- Distributed by: Metro-Goldwyn-Mayer
- Release date: August 15, 1931
- Running time: 41:00 (British Jailbirds cut); 55:00 (original release and reissue); 64:00 (extended cut); 70:22 (current DVD version)
- Country: United States
- Language: English

Pardon Us is a 1931 American pre-Code Laurel and Hardy film. It was the team's first starring feature-length comedy film, produced by Hal Roach, directed by James Parrott, and originally distributed by Metro-Goldwyn-Mayer in 1931.

== Plot ==
During Prohibition, Stan and Ollie are outside a malt-and-hops store offering ingredients for brewing. Ollie announces his intention to brew 15 gallons of beer, but Stan protests that they can't drink 15 gallons. Ollie says, "What we can't drink, we can sell." They walk into the shop side by side, and then walk into prison side by side, with Stan having tried to sell their home brew to a policeman.

Stan's loose tooth makes an involuntary razzberry sound, which angers the prison officials. Stan and Ollie are assigned to cell 14 alongside five other inmates, including the notorious "Tiger," the toughest prisoner. Stan's recurrent razzberry earns him unexpected respect and friendship from the intimidating Tiger. Laurel and Hardy's continued bungling ultimately lands them in solitary confinement.

During a riot, Stan and Ollie manage to escape. Their flight leads them to a cotton plantation, where they hide in blackface amongst a collective of African American sharecroppers to evade detection. A musical interlude sees Ollie serenading the crowd with "Lazy Moon" while Stan dances. The warden, having car trouble nearby, fails to recognize them—until Stan's razzberry gives them away, and back they go to jail.

Subsequent events see Ollie inadvertently undergoing dental treatment intended for Stan. They vow to go on a hunger strike, but wind up in the mess hall anyway. The prisoners are running guns under the tables, but Stan fires a machine gun in panic and quells the attempted riot.

The Tiger and his gang are determined to capture the guards and take control of the prison. Stan still has his machine gun, and frightens the advancing gang. The plot fails, earning them an official pardon from the grateful warden. Ollie plans to start all over again while Stan immediately asks if they can take an order from the warden for a couple of cases of beer.

== Cast ==
- Stan Laurel as Stan
- Oliver Hardy as Ollie
- Wilfred Lucas as Warden
- June Marlowe as Warden's Daughter
- James Finlayson as Schoolteacher
- Walter Long as The Tiger
- Tiny Sandford as Shields, Prison Guard
- Otto Fries as Dentist
- Charlie Hall as Dentist's Assistant
- Harry Bernard as Prison Registrar
- Bob Kortman and Leo Willis as members of Tiger's gang

== Production ==
After the release of MGM's hit The Big House with Chester Morris and Wallace Beery, producer Hal Roach decided to feature Laurel and Hardy in a short comedy spoofing the current prison drama. Roach felt that since his product was being released through MGM, he would be able to borrow existing sets used in The Big House to keep costs down. MGM studio head Louis B. Mayer agreed to the idea, provided that Laurel & Hardy would appear in a feature film for MGM in exchange. Roach declined Mayer's terms and hired set designer Frank Durlauf to build an exact replica of the needed prison sets.

Pardon Us began production as The Rap in June 1930. To Roach's dismay, shooting went over schedule, with enough material for two prison-themed films. As a result, it was decided that The Rap be released as a full-length feature film, Laurel and Hardy's first as stars. Previewed in August 1930 as Their First Mistake (later the title of a different Laurel & Hardy film), the film ran 70 minutes, and was subject to lukewarm reviews, in which critics stated that the movie needed tightening. Stan Laurel, who was always involved in the editing of his films, suggested withdrawing the feature and shooting new scenes while deleting unnecessary ones. The film was withheld for a year as it was reworked.

Leroy Shield's musical score was added during post-production. With the film's year-long delay for revisions, many of the score selections written for the film were already appearing as underscore in Laurel and Hardy and Our Gang short films released in the interim. For example, "Good Old Days," the score composition written and used for the prison classroom scenes featuring Finlayson, was put into use as the Our Gang theme song. Pardon Us was eventually released by MGM on August 15, 1931, a year after its first preview, with a final running time of 55 minutes.

June Marlowe, who was simultaneously appearing as schoolmarm Miss Crabtree in the Our Gang series, appears only briefly in the film despite receiving third billing after Laurel and Hardy. An elaborate sequence was filmed, in which the convicts set the prison on fire as part of their escape plan, and the warden's daughter is seen screaming from her second-floor bedroom. Stan Laurel did not find this sequence satisfactory, and staged the much simpler ending involving the boys holding the convicts at bay with a machine gun. In the released version, June Marlowe does not appear in this scene at all, but the scene is intact in the Spanish version of Pardon Us. This version has an alternate ending with Stan looking at their prison mugshots, much to the disgust of Ollie who rips them up. Pardon Us was released in the UK under the title Jailbirds as a four-reel (40 minute) featurette.

== Reception ==
Leonard Maltin wrote, "L&H's first starring feature film is amusing spoof of The Big House and prison films in general; slow pacing is its major debit, but many funny bits make it a must for fans of Stan and Ollie." Leslie Halliwell gave it one of four stars: "Patchy star comedy which finds the boys on the whole not in quite their best form."

== Foreign-language versions ==
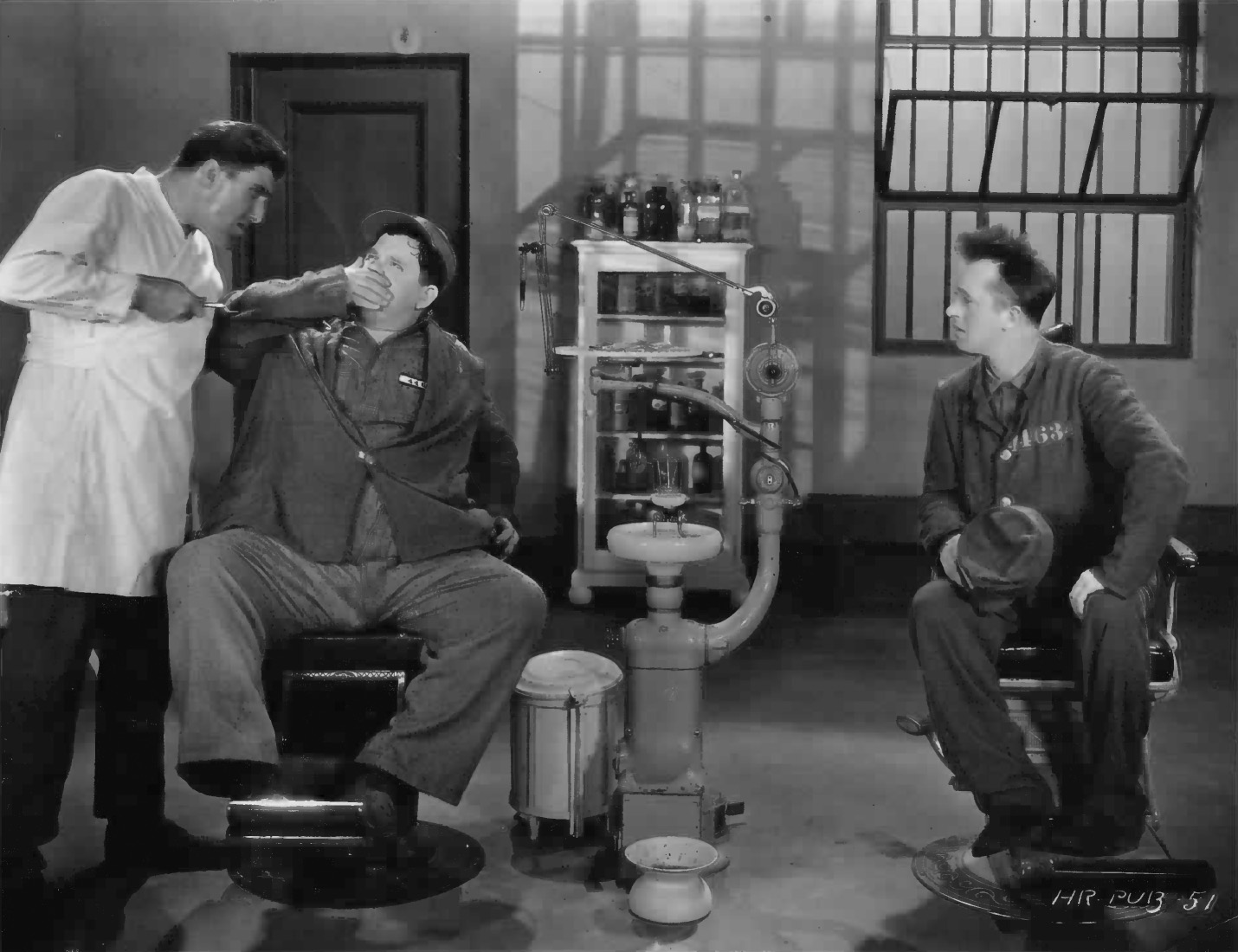
Raoul Paoli played the role of the dentist in the French-language version of Pardon Us, now a lost film.

During the early era of sound cinema, Hollywood studios frequently produced foreign-language versions of their films, using the same sets, costumes, and production elements. While many of these adaptations have been lost, the Spanish-language rendition of Pardon Us exists as De Bote en Bote ("From Cell to Cell").

In addition to the Spanish version, counterparts were created in other languages, including Italian (Muraglie), German (Hinter Schloss und Riegel), and French (Sous Les Verrous/ Under Lock and Key). The French and Italian versions are not known to survive - only stills from either version are known to exist. Fragments of the German version were unearthed in 1999 and are accessible on DVD.

The foreign-language adaptations were filmed, depending on the scene, either concurrently with the English-language version or immediately after early previews (to prevent filming multiple versions of scenes which would be cut). featuring actors who were fluent in the respective languages. Laurel, Hardy, and Marlowe reprise their roles in all versions; Long reprises his role in at least the Spanish version via dubbing by a fluent voiceover artist. Language coaches assisted the actors, while English-speaking performers relied on phonetically transcribed cue cards positioned just outside the camera's view. Boris Karloff is reported to have had a minor role in the French version, prior to his iconic role in Frankenstein, released later in 1931 (previous sources have reported that he played "The Tiger").

This method, predating modern dubbing techniques, allowed for better synchronization with the picture element than a fully dubbed version could provide at the time, but proved costly and labor-intensive. These alternate-language versions were very profitable for Hal Roach, but he was forced by MGM to stop making them because they were hurting the sales of MGM's subtitled films.

== Availability ==
Pardon Us exists in three versions of different length. The original-release version of 1931 and the reissue version of 1945 both run 55 minutes. This is the version that was reprinted for movie theaters, television, and home movies for four decades. A mid-1980s laserdisc release used the preview print of Pardon Us, running 64 minutes. It contained additional scenes with the warden, solitary confinement, and a second performance of "Hand Me Down My Silver Trumpet Gabriel". This version has been shown several times on the cable network American Movie Classics. The 64-minute version also aired on the TCM cable network.

In 2004, Universal Studios issued the complete 1930 preview version on a European DVD, which includes added scenes taken from preview copies. This version, running at 70 minutes, was also released in 2011 as part of Laurel and Hardy: The Essential Collection. The re-inserted scenes did not originally include music score accompaniment when discovered. This was resolved by adding Leroy Shield's music cues recreated by The Beau Hunks, a Dutch revivalist music ensemble, on their 1994 album The Beau Hunks Play the Original Little Rascals Music.
