= Arthur Horner (cartoonist) =

Australian cartoonist

Arthur Horner (10 May 1916 – 25 January 1997) was an Australian cartoonist, active for much of his working life in Britain, and best known for the comic strip Colonel Pewter.

== Biography ==
Arthur Wakefield Horner was born in Melbourne and lived in the suburb of Malvern until his family moved to Sydney in 1930. Here he attended Sydney Boys High School, becoming school captain in 1933. Horner trained at Sydney's National Art School during which time he made money acting in radio drama as well as working for magazines such as Smith's Weekly, The Bulletin and the ABC Weekly. He enlisted to fight in the Second World War in 1940, serving firstly as a camouflage officer in Dutch New Guinea and then as history officer in the 9th Division of the A. I. F. in British Borneo. Travelling to Europe in 1947, he worked in railway construction in Yugoslavia and also worked in Prague. In London, he attended the Central School for Arts and Crafts (now the Central School of Art and Design) where he studied painting under Ruskin Spear and Bernard Meninsky. He also worked for magazines such as Tribune, New Statesman and Punch.

Horner married Vicky (Victoria) Cowdry in London. Cowdry had previously enjoyed a successful career as an artist in Sydney. One of their daughters, Jane Sullivan, would later write of the couple's lasting and empathetic partnership.

Horner explained the genesis of his best-known creation, Colonel Pewter, to James Boswell in 1959:

I was working at the News Chronicle in 1952. Had been there since 1950 doing general illustrating and pocket cartoons – topical stuff – when someone in a pub told me they had heard the N.C. was looking for a strip. I brooded on an idea for some months before submitting to the editor a brief synopsis of "Colonel Pewter in Ironicus." He decided to give it a trial, and with two or three breaks the strip has been running ever since.

Colonel Pewter ran with occasional interruptions (Horner was the sole writer and artist for the strip, and necessarily took holidays) from 1952 to 1970, in both England and Australia, with a brief, temporary, revival in 1977. The Horners returned to Australia in 1976; Arthur had maintained a strong profile in Melbourne for decades particularly by dint of the syndication of Colonel Pewter in the Age. He worked primarily for that paper as well as undertaking book illustrations and other cartooning work. Two new strips ran in the Age, both conceived with finite continuities. These were The Uriel Report, from 1978 to 1979 and Dig: a graphic history of Terra Australis Incognita in 1980. Both of these strips presented a satirical view of contemporary Australia; The Uriel Report used a character central to a Colonel Pewter story from the late 1960s, an angel on Earth, to provide commentary on Australia in the late 1970s.

Three book collections of Pewter strips were published - two in Britain and one in Australia - and in Australia the entire Uriel Report was collected in 1979 alongside the Colonel Pewter story which had featured that character. The characters in Colonel Pewter, though rendered affectionately, were arguably the product of an outsider's view of the British class system, though Horner was also aware of class distinction in Australia as well. Jane Sullivan wrote in 1997:

For all his affection for Colonel Pewter, he despised the gentry. He was an old-style socialist with a passion for social justice that found its expression in his political cartoons. Anyone who thought he was too gentle for his own good should have seen his fire when he denounced the crass capitalists – and, worst of all, the English and Australian Labor politicians with their talk of pragmatism and compromise, the men he thought betrayed the spirit of the Left.’

In his 70s Horner became profoundly deaf and was diagnosed with Parkinson's disease, but while this curtailed his capacity to draw and compelled him to retire, he was writing letters to the Age as late as 1993, when he detailed the kind concern and care of passers-by who attended to him when he collapsed at North Brighton station. On his death four years later, at the age of 80, he was survived by daughters Jane Sullivan, a journalist, and Julia Houghton, an artist, as well as a stepdaughter, Diane Romney. Victoria Horner had predeceased her husband: she died in 1994.

== Colonel Pewter ==
Ostensibly a response to Wally Fawkes' strip Flook, the Colonel Pewter strip began in the News Chronicle in 1952 and then on that newspaper's demise in 1960 The Daily Mail followed by The Guardian where it ran between 1964 and 1970, when Horner, who had found the routine of maintaining quality to a deadline very stressful, retired it. Colonel Pewter was the London Guardian's first comic strip. The strip ran regularly in the Melbourne Age across its existence, irrespective of the British newspaper featuring it.

Colonel Hugo Albion Pewter was only one of a large number of characters, some constant and others temporary, in a strip which was designed to appeal to both children and adults. An episodic, yet light-hearted, feature in which storylines tended to run across three months, it focused on the adventures of the Colonel and his great-nephew, Martin, a boy of around ten, who live in a mansion, 'Chukkas', in Much Overdun, Whimshire. Other characters included Martin's cat, Chloe, intelligent yet non-verbal; the housekeeper, Mrs. Aspic; an 'Upper Palaeolithic' butler, Glub, and a 'space dog cross', Sirius. Initially Colonel Pewter was notable for tinkering with inventions, at which time wearing a tea-cosy kept his brain 'simmering'. He also owned a 'holdall' with almost infinite capacity. Although the strip always maintained its fantasy, magical element, it also came to emphasise social satire and commentary on 1950s and 60s Britain. Horner mused in 1959 that "Pewter began as a harmless pottering eccentric but as time went on a kind of cussedness broke through and he developed more complex characteristics… His social background has grown to be full of oddity that accumulates like flotsam."

Ian C. Thomas has compiled a list of 54 Colonel Pewter adventures, including a final one much later than the original continuity: Horner briefly revived the strip in 1977 for a new story set in Australia, "The Pukka Ashes".

== Collections ==
- Colonel Pewter in Ironicus by Arthur Horner, with an introduction by Christopher Fry. London: Pall Mall Press Limited, 1957
- Sirius Dog Star: a brace of Col. Pewter stories by Arthur Horner ("Dog Star" and "Come Back, Sirius"). Newton Abbot, Devon: David & Charles, 1972. ISBN 0-7153-5715-8
- The Penguin Colonel Pewter: three Whimshire stories by Arthur Horner ("Greenfingers", "Outward Ho!", "Special Attraction"). Harmondsworth, Middlesex, England: Penguin Books Ltd., 1978 (strips originally from 1965, 1966, 1967). ISBN 0-14-070074-9
- The Book of Uriel as transcribed by Arthur Horner; and introduced by Terry Lane. Contains "Flying Visit," a Colonel Pewter story featuring Uriel along with most of the regular cast (from 1967, 1968), along with a compilation of The Uriel Report from the late '70s. Ringwood, Vic.: Penguin Books, 1979. ISBN 0-14-070080-3
