= Arthur Horner =

Arthur Horner may refer to:

- Arthur Horner (cartoonist) (1916–1997), Australian cartoonist
- Arthur Horner (trade unionist) (1894–1968), Welsh trade union leader and communist politician
