= Casanova Killer =

The Casanova Killer may refer to:

- Paul John Knowles (1946–1974)
- Glen Edward Rogers (1962-2025)
