= Sandy Fawkes =

British journalist (1929–2005)

- Born: Unity Pansy Boyce-Carmichelle; 30 June 1929
- Died: 26 December 2005 (aged 76)
- Education: Camberwell College of Arts
- Occupations: Journalist, author
- Employers: Daily Sketch; Daily Express
- Spouse: Wally Fawkes (m. 1949, divorced)
- Children: 4

Sandra Fawkes (née Unity Pansy Boyce-Carmichele; 30 June 1929 – 26 December 2005) was a British journalist.

== Biography ==
Fawkes was found as a baby in the Grand Union Canal. She never discovered the identity of her birth parents. Her birth was registered in the third quarter of 1929 as Unity Pansy Boyce-Carmichele. (The birthdate above is presumably an approximation.)

Fawkes studied at Camberwell School of Art under John Minton. In 1949, she married Wally Fawkes, author of the cartoon strip Flook. The couple had four children, Sarah, Joanna, Kate and Jamie of whom the first, Sarah, died of SIDS. In the 1960s she worked as fashion editor for both Vanity Fair and the Daily Sketch, and then in the 1970s, feature writer for the Daily Express. She and Fawkes divorced in 1964; she did not remarry.

In 1974, Fawkes went to the United States on an unsuccessful assignment to try and interview several celebrities, including Vice-President Spiro Agnew. During this time she had a three-day affair with a man who turned out to be the serial killer Paul Knowles, and wrote a best selling book, Killing Time, later republished as Natural Born Killer. She said Knowles had been going by the name Daryl Golden and was unsatisfying in the bedroom, requiring self-stimulation in order to have sex. Later she was distraught to find out her acquaintance Susan MacKenzie had almost been raped by the killer at gunpoint following their time together.

Fawkes died on 26 December 2005.

== Other works ==
She ghostwrote Christine Keeler's autobiography, Nothing But. Her tutor John Minton introduced her to Soho's drinking culture and she became a denizen of Soho's pubs and drinking clubs, in particular The French House, the Coach & Horses and The Colony Room Club. As a result, she appeared several times in the Private Eye cartoon strip The Regulars by Michael Heath and had a small part in John Maybury's film Love Is the Devil: Study for a Portrait of Francis Bacon.
