= Good Old Days (Leroy Shield song) =

"Good Old Days" is a 1930 instrumental song written by Leroy Shield, which was the theme song for Hal Roach's Our Gang comedy short films, now known as The Little Rascals.

== History ==
The tune was originally written as score for a prison schoolroom scene in Pardon Us, Laurel & Hardy's first feature film as a team. Shield, a musical director hired by the Roach studio on loan from RCA Victor, had been requested by Hal Roach to also write a theme for Our Gang while he was scoring Pardon Us, and when Roach came to check on progress for the theme, Shield submitted the selection from the Pardon Us score to satisfy the request.

As Pardon Us was delayed and not released in theaters until August 1931, "Goold Old Days" was first heard as the opening and recurring theme for the Our Gang short Teacher's Pet in October 1930. "Good Old Days" was subsequently used as the theme in nearly every subsequent Roach Our Gang comedy (with exceptions such as 1934's Mike Fright and 1937's Our Gang Follies of 1938).

The tune caught on immediately, and NBC Radio Network show Kaltenmeyer's Kindergarten also set lyrics to the melody. In 1938, Roach sold the Our Gang unit to Metro-Goldwyn-Mayer, who would produce the comedy shorts until 1944. The MGM Our Gang shorts used a different theme arranged by MGM short-subject musical director David Snell: a medley of "London Bridge Is Falling Down, "Mulberry Bush," and "The Farmer in the Dell."

The tune was among those revived by Dutch revivalist band The Beau Hunks for one of their Leroy Shield tribute albums, The Beau Hunks Play the Little Rascals Music, in 1995. It was also used in Universal Pictures and Amblin Entertainment's 1994 feature film adaptation of The Little Rascals.
