= Eddie Harvey =

British jazz musician (1925–2012)

Edward Thomas Harvey (15 November 1925 – 9 October 2012) was a British jazz musician (piano, trombone, arranger and educator).

== Early life ==
Eddie Harvey was born in Blackpool, England, but grew up in Sidcup, where he attended Chislehurst and Sidcup Grammar School. At the age of 16, he began studying engineering in nearby Crayford. He also took his first professional job as a musician playing trombone with George Webb and his Dixielanders, a pioneering UK traditional jazz band featuring Wally Fawkes and Humphrey Lyttelton.

== Musical career ==
After the Second World War, Harvey joined Freddy Randall, and he also began performing at Club Eleven in London with several young musicians — among them Ronnie Scott and John Dankworth — who were starting to experiment with the bebop style that they had picked up from US musicians like Charlie Parker and Dizzy Gillespie. When John Dankworth formed the Dankworth Seven in 1950, Harvey was a founder member, and the percussionist vocalist Frank Holder was also featured in this group. Harvey stayed until 1953. Now performing on both piano and trombone, Eddie Harvey spent the 1950s performing and recording with several important UK jazz groups, including bands led by Tubby Hayes, Vic Lewis, Don Rendell, and Woody Herman. He also began arranging for groups like Jack Parnell's Orchestra.

== Jazz education ==
From 1963 to 1972, Harvey was a pianist with the Humphrey Lyttelton band. In the early 1970s, he also became interested in teaching jazz. His jazz piano course at the City Lit was one of the first jazz education courses in Europe and led to his writing Teach Yourself Jazz Piano, published in the Teach Yourself series. From 1968 - 1971, Ed studied at Balls Park College of Education, Hertford. He joined the teacher training course with Hal Colin, guitarist, and Pete Blanin, bass. With their extensive friendship within the professional jazz community, they were able to invite jazz players like Kathy Stobart et al. to perform jazz concerts at the college for the students. After ten years teaching music at Haileybury College in Hertfordshire, he accepted the newly created role of Head of Jazz at the London College of Music. Later teaching posts included the Guildhall and Royal Colleges of Music.
