= Good Day =

Good Day may refer to:

== Music ==
- Good Day (group), a South Korean girl group
- Good Day, an album by Dog Age, 1989

=== Songs ===
- "Good Day" (The Dresden Dolls song), 2003
- "Good Day" (Hayley Warner song), 2009
- "Good Day" (IU song), 2010
- "Good Day" (Jewel song), 2006
- "Good Day" (The Kinks song), 1984
- "Good Day" (Sean Maguire song), 1996
- "Good Day" (Tally Hall song), 2005, 2006, 2008
- "Good Day" (Zard song), 1998
- "Good Day", by Angels & Airwaves from We Don't Need to Whisper, 2006
- "Good Day", by Bombay Bicycle Club from Everything Else Has Gone Wrong, 2020
- "Good Day", by DNCE from DNCE, 2016
- "Good Day", by Kara from Rock U, 2008
- "Good Day", by Luce from Luce, 2001
- "Good Day", by Nappy Roots from The Humdinger, 2007
- "Good Day", by Nektar from ...Sounds Like This, 1973
- "Good Day", by Paul Westerberg from Eventually, 1996
- "Good Day", by Twenty One Pilots from Scaled and Icy, 2021

== Media ==
=== Radio ===
- On Air with Doug, Jen and Victoria, an American syndicated news/talk program hosted by Doug Stephan, known as Doug Stephan's Good Day for most of its existence
- "Good day!" was the phrase used by American broadcaster Paul Harvey to sign off his daily News and Comment broadcasts
  - Good Day! The Paul Harvey Story, a biography by Paul J. Batura, published shortly after Harvey's death in 2009

=== Television ===
- Good Day! (TV program), a 1973–1991 morning show on WCVB-TV in Boston, Massachusetts
- Good Day (TV program), a 2025 South Korean variety show
- Several local morning newscasts on Fox owned-and-operated and affiliated television stations in the United States, including:
  - Good Day L.A. Los Angeles, California
  - Good Day New York New York City, New York
  - Good Day Chicago, on WFLD Chicago, Illinois
  - Good Day DC on WTTG Washington DC
  - Good Day DFW on KDFW, Dallas-Fort Worth, Texas
  - Good Day Alabama, on WBRC, Birmingham, Alabama
  - Good Day Philadelphia, on WTXF-TV Philadelphia, Pennsylvania
  - Good Day Tampa Bay, on WTVT Tampa/St. Petersburg, Florida
  - Good Day Atlanta, on WAGA Atlanta, Georgia
  - Colorado Morning News on FOX31 Good Day, on KDVR, Denver, Colorado
  - Good Day Orlando, on WOFL Orlando/Daytona Beach/Melbourne, Florida
  - Good Day Charlotte, on WJZY Belmont-Charlotte, North Carolina
  - Good Day Austin, on KTBC Austin, Texas
  - Good Day Maine, on WPFO, Portland, Maine
  - Good Day Columbus, on WSYX/WTTE, Columbus, Ohio
  - Good Day Oregon, on KPTV, Portland, Oregon
  - Good Day Wisconsin, on WLUK-TV, Green Bay, Wisconsin
  - Good Day Seattle, on KCPQ, Seattle, Washington
  - "Good Day", a television-news music package, produced by Frank Gari, used by some Good Day programs
- Good Day (formerly Good Day Sacramento), a local morning newscast on KMAX-TV, Sacramento, California

=== Film ===
- Good Day (film), a 2025 Indian Tamil-language film

== Religion ==
- "Good Day" is the literal translation of the Hebrew יום טוב (Yom Tov, plural ימים טובים Yamim Tovim) used to refer to a Jewish holiday or holidays

== See also ==
- Good Days (disambiguation)
- A Good Day (disambiguation)
- G'day (wiktionary), an Australian greeting
- Goedendag, a Medieval Flemish weapon whose name means "Good day" in Dutch
- "Good Day Sunshine", a 1966 song by the Beatles
- "It's a Good Day", a 1946 song by Peggy Lee and Dave Barbour
- "It Was a Good Day", a 1993 song by Ice Cube
