= A Good Day =

A Good Day may refer to:

- A Good Day (Jessica Molaskey album), 2003
- A Good Day (Priscilla Ahn album), 2008
- "A Good Day", a song by Billy Ray Cyrus from his 2009 album Back to Tennessee
- "A Good Day", a season six episode of The West Wing
- "A Good Day", a song by Timothy B. Schmit from his 2009 album Expando

== See also ==
- Good Day (disambiguation)
- "A Good Night", a 2018 song by John Legend featuring BloodPop
