= The Cairos =

Australian alternative indie band

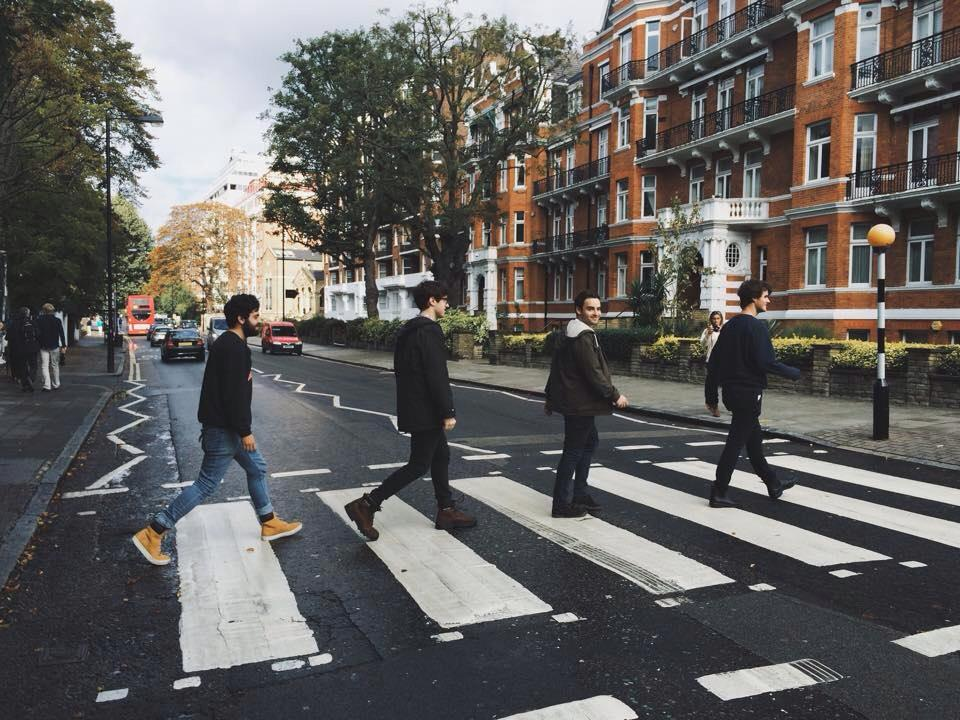
- The band outside Abbey Road Studios, 2014

Background information
- Origin: Brisbane, Queensland, Australia
- Genres: Alternative, Indie
- Years active: 2009–2016; 2020–2021; 2023–present
- Label: Island Records Australia
- Members: Alistar Richardson; Alfio Alivuzza; Reuben Schafer; Jacob Trotter
- Past members: BC Michaels; Sean Caskey; Dan Koyama
- Website: thecairos.com.au

The Cairos are a Brisbane musical group. The band formed in Brisbane in 2007 and consists of members Alistar Richardson on vocals and guitar, Alfio Alivuzza on guitar, Reuben Schafer on bass and Jacob Trotter on drums.

The group has released one studio album, working with producer Nick Didia. Dream of Reason was released in May 2014 and peaked at No. 6 on the ARIA Hitseekers Albums chart. In 2016, the band went on indefinite hiatus, first reuniting in 2020 for a small number of festival appearances over the following years. The Cairos officially reformed in May 2024 with their return single, "Take a Look at Yourself".

== Discography ==
=== Studio albums ===
Title	Details
Dream of Reason	Released: May 2014; Label: Island Records (3779504); Format: CD, digital download

=== Extended plays ===
Title	Details
Lost At Sea	Released: 2009; Label: The Cairos; Format: CD, digital download
Colours Like Features	Released: April 2012; Label: Island Records (2788628); Format: CD, digital download

== Awards ==
=== Q Song Awards ===
The Queensland Music Awards (previously known as Q Song Awards) are annual awards celebrating Queensland, Australia's brightest emerging artists and established legends. They commenced in 2006.

Year	Nominee / work	Award	Result (wins only)
2010	"Today's Song"	QMusic Encouragement Award	Won
