= Barry Norman =

British film critic (1933–2017)

Barry Norman CBE
- Norman in 1977
- Born: Barry Leslie Norman; 21 August 1933; Lambeth, London, England
- Died: 30 June 2017 (aged 83); Stevenage, Hertfordshire, England
- Resting place: All Saints' Church, Datchworth, Hertfordshire, England
- Education: Hurstpierpoint College; Highgate School
- Occupations: Film critic, television presenter, journalist
- Years active: 1960–2001
- Television: Film...
- Spouse: Diana Narracott (m. 1957; died 2011)
- Children: 2
- Parents: Leslie Norman (father); Elizabeth Crafford (mother)

Barry Leslie Norman (21 August 1933 – 30 June 2017) was a British film critic, television presenter and journalist. He presented the BBC's cinema review programme, Film..., from 1972 to 1998.

== Early life ==
Born at St Thomas' Hospital, London, on 21 August 1933, Norman was the eldest of three children of film director Leslie Norman, and Elizabeth Norman (née Crafford). He was the brother of script editor and director Valerie Norman (making him the former brother-in-law of Bernard Williams). Norman was educated at a state primary school and then at Hurstpierpoint College in West Sussex – at the time, the college did not admit the sons of tradespeople and there was a lengthy debate as to whether his father's occupation at the time, as a film editor, was a trade or not. At age 12 he went to Highgate School, then an all-boys independent school in North London from January 1946 until July 1951. He did not go to university, opting instead to study shipping management at Islington Technical College.

== Career ==
Norman began his career in journalism with the West London newspaper The Kensington News. He later spent a period in South Africa working for The Star in Johannesburg, then moving to Salisbury, Rhodesia (now known as Harare, Zimbabwe) where he wrote for The Rhodesia Herald. In Africa he developed a hostility to the effects of apartheid.

When he returned to the UK, Norman became a gossip columnist for the Daily Sketch, and then show-business editor of the Daily Mail until May 1971, when he was made redundant when the two papers merged. Subsequently, he wrote a column for The Observer and each Wednesday for The Guardian, also contributing leader columns to the newspaper. He was one of the collaborators with Wally Fawkes on the long-running cartoon strip Flook. He contributed a column to the Radio Times for many years, and wrote several novels.

Norman presented BBC1's Film... programme from 1972, becoming the sole presenter the following year. The theme was a recording of Billy Taylor playing his 1952 composition "I Wish I Knew How It Would Feel to Be Free". Norman's involvement was interrupted in 1982 by a brief spell presenting Omnibus. After returning to the Film series in 1983, Norman became increasingly irritated by the BBC's reluctance to screen it at a regular time, and in 1998 finally accepted an offer to work for BSkyB, where he remained for three years. Jonathan Ross took his place as the BBC programme's presenter.

In a 2013 article for the Radio Times, Norman listed what he considered to be the 49 best British films of all time. The list included The Cruel Sea (1953), Chariots of Fire (1981), and Skyfall (2012). Norman explained: "In most cases the criteria I used was whether these films were going to last; whether new generations of cinema-goers would want to watch them in 20 years' time [...] Most are quite old films, but they all appeal to this generation of film-goers as much as they did when they were first made."

Norman wrote and presented a number of documentary series for the BBC and ITV, including Hollywood Greats (1977–1983), Barry Norman's Guide to American Soaps (1985), Talking Pictures (1987), and Soaps Down Under in 1991.

Norman was, together with Elton Welsby, the main anchorman for Channel 4's coverage of the 1988 Summer Olympics in Seoul. Also Norman presented part of Comic Relief in 1990 and 1991.

Norman was for some years a regular radio broadcaster on BBC Radio 4. In 1974, he presented Today, and was the first chairman of The News Quiz. He was the original presenter of the BBC Radio 4 transport-and-travel show Going Places and of its sister travel-magazine, Breakaway. Other shows included The Chip Shop, an early 1980s series dedicated to the emerging home-computer industry. In 1996, he presented an interview series for BBC Radio 5 Live.

Norman was associated with the phrase "And why not?", which was often attributed to that of his puppet likeness on the satirical ITV show Spitting Image. Norman explained to Empire magazine in 2014 that it had originated from a Rory Bremner sketch show on Channel 4. Norman later adopted the phrase himself, and it is the title of his 2003 autobiography. In 2008, Norman launched a brand of pickled onions using a recipe handed down through his family.

== Personal life ==
Norman married author Diana Narracott (born 25 August 1933) on 12 October 1957; the couple lived in Datchworth, Hertfordshire, for many years and both of their daughters (Samantha and Emma) were born there. Diana Norman died on 27 January 2011 at the age of 77. Norman's 2013 book See You in the Morning was written as a celebration of their life together.

Norman had a passion for cricket and wrote a book on the subject. He was a member of the MCC and enjoyed spending time at Lord's watching cricket.

== Political views ==
Norman was a supporter of the Liberal Democrats, having been a supporter of the Labour Party until the formation of the Social Democratic Party in 1981. He named Shirley Williams as the politician he most admired.

== Death ==
Norman died in his sleep, aged 83, on 30 June 2017, at the Lister Hospital in Stevenage having been afflicted with lung cancer in his later years. A memorial service was held at St Paul's, Covent Garden in April 2018.

=== Tributes ===
Writing in The Guardian, journalist Dennis Barker and film critic Derek Malcolm said that Norman "perfected a flair for talking beguilingly about cinema to a mass television audience but in a way that did not make true aficionados wince. As the presenter and critic of BBC TV’s original Film 72 through to Film 98, he was knowledgeable without affectation, and he did not seem overawed by the industry's leading lights."

Chief Guardian film critic Peter Bradshaw wrote that Norman's "enthusiasm and love for film always shone through" and he was "an accessible, unpretentious surveyor of cinema". Mark Kermode wrote that "watching Barry Norman review films was a pleasure, an education, and an inspiration. Wit, knowledge and wry enthusiasm. He was the Master", and Jonathan Ross, who replaced him as presenter of the BBC's Film... series, described him as "a great critic and a lovely, lovely man".

== Awards and honours ==
- BAFTA's Richard Dimbleby Award, 1981.
- Magazine Columnist of the Year, 1991.
- Commander of the Order of the British Empire (CBE), 1998.

== Bibliography ==
- The Bumper Book of Cricket, (2009).
- 100 Best Films of the Century, (1992).
- The Bird Dog Tape, (1992).
- The Mickey Mouse Affair, (1996).
- And Why Not?: Memoirs of a Film Lover (2003).
- See You in the Morning (2013).
