= Humphrey Lyttelton =

English trumpeter and broadcaster (1921–2008)

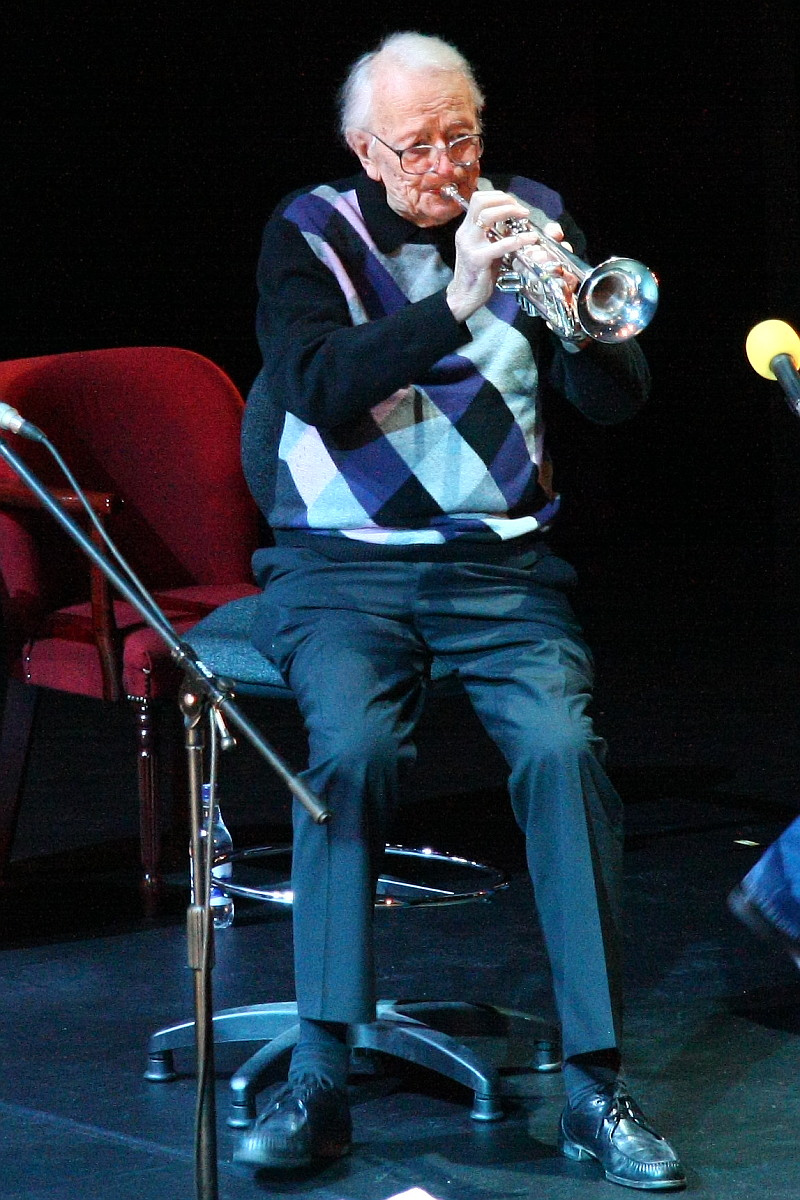
- ISIHAC Christmas Special, 2007
- Born: Humphrey Richard Adeane Lyttelton; 23 May 1921; Eton College, Buckinghamshire, England
- Died: 25 April 2008 (aged 86); London, England
- Education: Eton College
- Spouse(s): Patricia Mary Braithwaite (m. 1948; div. 1952) (Elizabeth) Jill Richardson (m. 1952; died 2006)
- Father: George Lyttelton
- Relatives: 8th Viscount Cobham (paternal grandfather)
- Musical career
- Genres: Jazz; Dixieland
- Occupations: Musician; composer; radio presenter; cartoonist
- Instruments: Trumpet; clarinet
- Years active: 1945–2008
- Label: Calligraph
- Military career
- Allegiance: United Kingdom
- Branch: British Army
- Service years: 1941–1945
- Unit: Grenadier Guards
- Conflicts: World War II; Operation Avalanche

Humphrey Richard Adeane "Humph" Lyttelton (23 May 1921 – 25 April 2008) was an English jazz musician and broadcaster from the Lyttelton family.

Having taught himself the trumpet at school, Lyttelton became a professional musician, leading his own eight-piece band, which recorded a hit single, "Bad Penny Blues", in 1956. As a broadcaster, he presented BBC Radio 2's The Best of Jazz for forty years, and hosted the comedy panel game I'm Sorry I Haven't a Clue on BBC Radio 4, becoming the UK's oldest panel game host.

Lyttelton was also a cartoonist, collaborating on the long-running Flook series in the Daily Mail, and a calligrapher and president of The Society for Italic Handwriting.

== Early life ==
Lyttelton was born at Eton College (then in Buckinghamshire), where his father, George William Lyttelton (second son of the 8th Viscount Cobham), was a house master. (As a male-line descendant of Charles Lyttelton, Lyttelton was in remainder to both the Viscountcy Cobham and the Barony of Lyttelton.) From Sunningdale Preparatory School, Lyttelton duly progressed to Eton College. He was a first cousin of the 10th Viscount Cobham and of Viola Grosvenor, Duchess of Westminster and a great-nephew of the politician and sportsman Alfred Lyttelton, the first man to represent England at both football and cricket, both of whom also attended Eton.

At Eton, Lyttelton fagged for Lord Carrington and formed his love of jazz. He was inspired by the trumpeters Louis Armstrong (who subsequently referred to Lyttelton as "that cat in England who swings his ass off") and Nat Gonella. He taught himself the instrument, and formed a quartet at the school in 1936 that included the future journalist Ludovic Kennedy on drums.

After leaving school, Lyttelton spent some time at the Port Talbot steel plate works in South Wales, an experience which led to his becoming what he termed a "romantic socialist". After being called up for war service, he was commissioned in the Grenadier Guards as a second lieutenant on 29 November 1941 alongside future politician Mark Bonham Carter, and saw action at Salerno, Italy, during Operation Avalanche, when he came ashore with his pistol in one hand, and his trumpet in the other.

On VE Day, 8 May or 9 May 1945, Lyttelton joined in the celebrations by playing his trumpet from a wheelbarrow, inadvertently giving his first broadcast performance; the BBC recording still survives. Following demobilisation after World War II, he attended Camberwell Art College for two years.

In 1949, he joined the Daily Mail as a cartoonist, where he remained until 1956. He was one of the collaborators with Wally Fawkes on the long-running cartoon strip Flook.

== Jazz career ==
Lyttelton received a grant for further study. He went to Camberwell School of Art, where he met Wally Fawkes, a fellow jazz enthusiast and clarinet-player, also known as the cartoonist "Trog". In 1949, Fawkes helped him to get a job with the Daily Mail writing the words for Flook, Fawkes's comic strip. They had both joined the George Webb Dixielanders in 1947. Webb was an important catalyst in the British postwar jazz boom.

In the late 1940s and early 1950s Lyttelton was prominent in the British revival of traditional jazz forms from New Orleans, recording with Sidney Bechet in 1949. To do so he had to break with the Musicians' Union restrictive practices which forbade working with jazz musicians from the United States. In 1956, he had his only pop chart hit, with the Joe Meek-produced recording of "Bad Penny Blues", which was in the UK Singles Chart for six weeks.

Over time, Lyttelton gradually shifted to a more mainstream approach favoured by American musicians such as trumpeter Buck Clayton. By 1953 he had begun to add saxophonists to the lineup. On one occasion in that year, the development did not meet with the approval of his fans. At a Birmingham Town Hall concert at which alto saxophonist Bruce Turner debuted, a banner with the words "Go Home Dirty Bopper!" was prominently unfolded.

Occasionally, with the help of Eddie Harvey, he assembled a big band for BBC broadcasts and records. In 1957 and 1958 blues singer Jimmy Rushing toured England with the band, as did Clayton, Vic Dickenson and Big Joe Turner in 1965. Clayton recorded with Lyttelton in the early 1960s and toured with the band on numerous occasions. Clayton considered himself and Lyttelton to be brothers. He also recorded with visiting Americans Al Casey, Buddy Tate, and Kenny Davern.

He was the subject of This Is Your Life in 1958, when he was surprised by Eamonn Andrews at the BBC Television Theatre.

By now his repertoire had expanded, including not only lesser known Duke Ellington pieces, but even "The Champ" from Dizzy Gillespie's band book. The Lyttelton band—he saw himself primarily as a leader—helped develop the careers of many now prominent British musicians, including Tony Coe and Alan Barnes.

In 1983, Lyttelton formed Calligraph Records, which reissued some of his old recordings, all future recordings by his band, and recordings by band members.

On 11 March 2008, he announced that he would cease presenting BBC Radio 2's Best of Jazz.

On 23 July 2008, Lyttelton was posthumously named BBC Radio 2 Jazz Artist of the Year, voted by radio listeners.

=== Humphrey Lyttelton Band ===
For several years during the postwar period at 100 Oxford Street his regular band included Wally Fawkes, the Christie brothers, Pat Hawes and Johnny Parker. From 1958, Lyttelton's favoured line-up was an eight–piece band with three saxophones (alto, tenor and baritone), although this was reduced to seven occasionally to save money. But he would sometimes add the baritone again for broadcasts and recordings.

Lyttelton's mainstream band usually included such established musicians as Jimmy Skidmore, Joe Temperley, Kathy Stobart, Jimmy Hastings, Mike McKenzie, John Barnes, Roy Williams and Pete Strange along with new talent such as Tony Coe, Alan Barnes, John Picard, Karen Sharpe, and Jo Fooks. Lyttelton regarded his band as a family, with some members returning to the fold after periods away and/or staying for long periods (Bruce Turner, Stan Greig, Adrian Macintosh, Stobart, Hastings).

The band maintained a busy schedule, frequently performing sold-out shows across the country. Performances occasionally included a guest singer, or a collaboration with another band. During the 1990s the band toured with Helen Shapiro in a series of Humph and Helen concerts. They also featured in several Giants of British Jazz tours with Acker Bilk and George Melly and John Chilton's Feetwarmers.

Lyttelton had a long established professional relationship with UK singer Elkie Brooks. After working together in the early 1960s they rekindled their working partnership in early 2000 with a series of sold-out and well-received concert performances. In early 2000, the band played on the track "Life in a Glasshouse" on Radiohead's album Amnesiac, released the following year. In 2003, they released the critically acclaimed album Trouble in Mind and continued to perform occasional concerts. Lyttelton introduced American vocalist Stacey Kent to British audiences.

Lyttelton's last band featured, apart from himself on trumpet and clarinet: Ray Wordsworth on trombone; Jimmy Hastings on alto sax, clarinet and flute; Jo Fooks on tenor saxophone and flute; Rob Fowler on tenor sax, baritone sax and clarinet; Ted Beament on piano; John Rees-Jones on double bass and Adrian Macintosh on drums. His last formal recordings, one track each on trumpet and clarinet, appeared on his last CD 'Cornucopia 3', (CLG CD 46) all of which he supervised. Trumpet on the other tracks was played by Tony Fisher. He made some recordings as a vocalist.

After his death, part of Lyttelton's appearance with his 2007 Band, (with Karen Sharpe instead of Robert Fowler), at the Brecon Jazz Festival, in which he was joined by American tenor saxophonist Scott Hamilton was shown by BBCtv as a tribute, (Humph's Last Stand). The band continues to give concerts performing his music. The trumpet part is played by Tony Fisher with occasional guest spots by singer Sue Richardson and ex–Lytteltonians such as Karen Sharp.

== Radio personality ==
From 1967 until April 2007, Lyttelton presented The Best of Jazz on BBC Radio 2, a programme that featured his idiosyncratic mix of recordings from all periods of the music's history, including current material. In 2007 he chose to cut his commitment to two quarterly seasons per year, in order to spend more time on other projects.

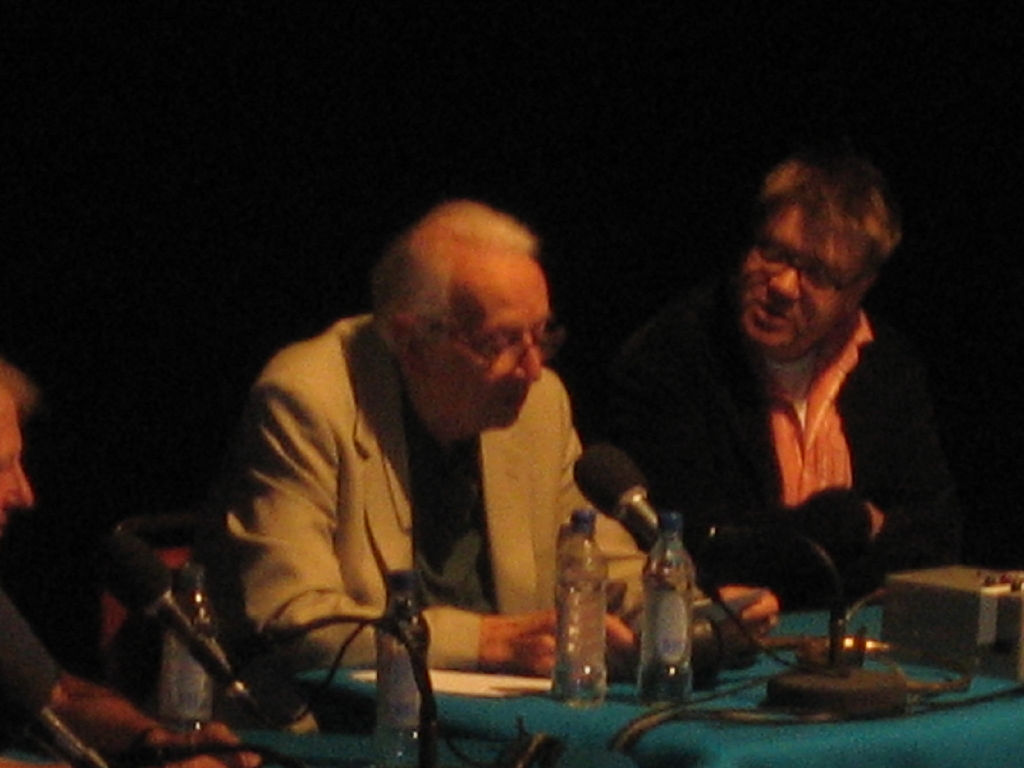
Humphrey Lyttelton and producer Jon Naismith at the 2005 Edinburgh Fringe

In 1972 Lyttelton was chosen to host the comedy panel game I'm Sorry I Haven't a Clue (ISIHAC) on BBC Radio 4. The show was originally devised as a comedic antidote to traditional BBC panel games (both radio and television), which had come to be seen as dull and formulaic, and in keeping with the staid middle-class "Auntie Beeb" image. Lyttelton continued in this role until shortly before he died, and was known for both his deadpan, disgruntled, and occasionally bewildered style of chairmanship, and for his near-the-knuckle double entendres and innuendo which, despite always being open to an innocent interpretation, were, according to William Rushton, "the filthiest thing on radio".

The programme's success had considerable influence on the manner in which comedy was presented on radio, and Lyttelton's persona was a significant part of that success: he was a straight man surrounded by mayhem. At the time of his death, Lyttelton was the oldest active panel game host in the UK, being two and a half years older than his closest rival, Nicholas Parsons.

As well as his other activities, Lyttelton was a keen calligrapher and President of The Society for Italic Handwriting. He named his own record label "Calligraph" after this extracurricular interest. This label, founded in the early 1980s, not only issues his own albums and those of associates, but also re-issues (on CD) his analogue recordings for the Parlophone label in the 1950s. He is reported to have turned down a knighthood in 1995.

== Personal life ==
Lyttelton was married twice. His first wife was Patricia Mary Braithwaite (born 1929), whom he married on 19 August 1948. They had one daughter, Henrietta (born 1949). In 1952, following his divorce, he married (Elizabeth) Jill Richardson (1933–2006), with whom he had two sons and a daughter, Stephen (born 1955) and David (born 1958), and Georgina (born 1963).

Despite his celebrity, he was intensely private. The house he had designed by John Voelcker in Arkley, Barnet, Greater London, had blank walls on the outside and the windows opening onto an internal courtyard. He hated using the telephone and kept his number ex-directory, changing it if anybody else discovered it. Given his dislike of the telephone, he communicated by post, including letters hiring and firing members of his band.

He twice refused state honours which were offered to him. One occasion was in 1976, and in 1994 he declined the knighthood offered by Downing Street: his son Stephen later wrote that "Accepting it was never an option but he still felt sick to the stomach. He kept it from all of us, especially my mother who would have exerted a lot of pressure on him to accept, seeing it as recognition for all his work."

== Illness and death ==
On 18 April 2008, Jon Naismith, the producer of I'm Sorry I Haven't A Clue, announced the cancellation of the spring series due to Lyttelton's hospitalisation to repair an aortic aneurysm. Rob Brydon and others were asked to deputise for Lyttelton during the tour shows, but Lyttelton postponed his operation and managed to perform on all but the last night. A further email on 21 April 2008 reported that the BBC were "unclear precisely how long Humph's recovery period will be" but Lyttelton was "otherwise fine and in very good spirits".

On 22 April 2008, Lyttelton and the I'm Sorry I Haven't a Clue team were booked to appear in the stage version of the programme at the Pavilion Theatre, Bournemouth. Because of his illness, his place was taken by Rob Brydon, but a pre-recorded message from Lyttelton was played to the audience ("I'm sorry I can't be with you today as I am in hospital—I wish I'd thought of this sooner!"). The panellists on that night were Tim Brooke-Taylor, Graeme Garden, Barry Cryer and Jeremy Hardy.

Lyttelton died following his surgery on 25 April 2008, with his family around him. After his death was reported, members of the public began leaving flowers at Mornington Crescent station. BBC Radio 4 broadcast a 1995 episode of I'm Sorry I Haven't a Clue as a tribute on Sunday 27 April, and a retrospective programme presented by Kenneth Clarke on Wednesday 30 April 2008. Radio 4 celebrated Humphrey Lyttelton Day on Sunday 15 June 2008, including a new profile of ISIHAC by Stephen Fry called Chairman Humph – A Tribute.

After his death, the controller of Radio 4, Mark Damazer, said: "He's just a colossally good broadcaster and possessed of this fantastic sense of timing. ... It's a very, very sad day but we should celebrate and be very grateful for how much he did for Radio 4, really terrific."

Responding to news of Lyttelton's death, Radiohead guitarist Jonny Greenwood wrote on the band's website: "We were all sorry to hear of Humphrey Lyttelton's death—he was an inspiring person to record with, and without his direction, we'd never have recorded/released 'Life in a Glasshouse'. So go and find 'Bad Penny Blues', and celebrate his life with some hot jazz."

Lyttelton is survived by his four children: a daughter from his first marriage to Pat Braithwaite, and two sons and a daughter from his second marriage to Jill Richardson. Richardson, to whom he had been married since 1952, predeceased him in 2006. His Humanist funeral took place on 6 May 2008 at the St Marylebone Crematorium (which shares grounds with East Finchley Cemetery) in East Finchley, north London. Lyttelton regarded himself as a Humanist.

On 25 April 2010, two years after Lyttelton's death, a celebratory concert entitled "Humphrey Lyttelton—A Celebration Concert" was held at the Hammersmith Apollo to celebrate his life, works and contribution to music. Singer Elkie Brooks and many prominent British jazz musicians appeared at the concert, along with panellists from I'm Sorry I Haven't a Clue. The event was organised and hosted by his son Stephen Lyttelton, who is also the founder and chairman of The Humph Trust, an organisation set up after his death to support young up and coming jazz musicians and to provide sponsorship and support.

The event was opened by the 2010 winner of the Humphrey Lyttelton Royal Academy of Music Jazz Award, Tom Walsh, who played Horace Silver's "Song for my Father" with his quintet from the Royal Academy of Music.

The Lyttelton Arms pub, opposite Mornington Crescent station in Camden, is named after Lyttelton. It was formerly named The Southampton Arms.

== Books ==
- Last Chorus: An Autobiographical Medley. London: JR Books Ltd, October 2008; 224 pp. ISBN 1-906217-18-1 (published posthumously)
- It Just Occurred to Me...: An Autobiographical Scrapbook. London: Robson Books, September 2006; 224 pp. ISBN 1-86105-901-9
- * Tim Brooke-Taylor, Graeme Garden, Barry Cryer, Humphrey Lyttelton: The Little Book of Mornington Crescent. London: Orion, 2000; 112 pp. ISBN 0-7528-1864-3
- * Tim Brooke-Taylor, Graeme Garden, Humphrey Lyttelton, Barry Cryer, Willie Rushton: I'm Sorry I Haven't a Clue: the Official Limerick Collection. London: Orion: 1998; 128 pp. ISBN 0-7528-1775-2
- The Best of Jazz. London: Robson Books, 1998; 423 pp. ISBN 1-86105-187-5
- The Best of Jazz: Vol 2 — Enter the Giants, London: Robson Books, 1998; 220 pp. ISBN 1-86105-188-3
- * Julian Purser Humph: A discography of Humphrey Lyttelton 1945-1983. Collectors Items, 1985; 49 pp. ISBN 0-946783-01-2
- Why No Beethoven?: Diary of a Vagrant Musician. London: Robson Books, 1984; 176 pp. ISBN 0-86051-262-2
- Jazz and Big Band Quiz. London: Batsford, 1979; 96 pp. ISBN 0-7134-2011-1
- The Best of Jazz 1: Basin Street to Harlem: Jazz Masters and Master Pieces, 1917-1930. London: Taplinger Publishing Co, 1978; 220 pp. ISBN 1-86105-188-3
- Best of Jazz. London: Robson Books, 1978; 224 pp. ISBN 0-903895-91-9
- I Play As I Please: The memoirs of an Old Etonian trumpeter. London: MacGibbon and Kee, 1954; 200pp. B0000CIVX1
- Second Chorus. London: MacGibbon and Kee, 1958; 198 pp. B0000CK30P
- Take It from the Top: An Autobiographical Scrapbook. London: Robson Books, 1975; 168 pp. ISBN 0-903895-56-0
