= Good Old Days (disambiguation) =

The good old days is a term used when referring to better times in the past.

Good Old Days may also refer to:

== Film and television ==
- The Good Old Days (film), a 1940 British comedy set in 1840
- The Good Old Days: The Love of AA, a 2010 Ghanaian film
- The Good Old Days (British TV series), a popular BBC television light entertainment television programme that ran from 1953 to 1983
- The Good Old Days (Hong Kong TV series), a 1996 Hong Kong drama series set in the early 20th century
- Good Old Days (Thai TV series), a 2022 Thai drama television series

== Music ==
- "Good Old Days" (Leroy Shield song), 1930 theme song for the Our Gang comedies, now known as The Little Rascals
- "Good Old Days" (Macklemore song), 2017
- Good Ol' Days (album), by the Reklaws, 2022
- "The Good Old Days", by Roger Miller 1965
- "Good Old Days", a song on the 1988 album Even Worse by "Weird Al" Yankovic
- "The Good Old Days", a song on the 2002 album Up the Bracket by UK band The Libertines
- "Good Old Days", a Ziggy Marley song from the 2003 album Dragonfly
- "The Good Old Days", a song from the 2003 album Shootenanny! by Eels
- "Good Old Days", a bonus track on the deluxe edition of Pink's 2012 album The Truth About Love
- "Good Old Days," one of two song from the 2014 EP of the same name, by American Indie Rock Band, The Features
- Good Ole Days, a 2017 album by Tracy Lawrence
- "The Good Ol' Days", 2019 song by Frankie Moreno
- "Good Old Days", 2023 song by The Revivalists

== Book ==
- The Good Old Days: The Holocaust as Seen by Its Perpetrators and Bystanders, a book by Ernst Klee, Willi Dressen and Volker Reiss

== See also ==
- In the Good Old Days (When Times Were Bad), 1969 Dolly Parton album
