= George Webb (musician) =

British pianist (1917–2010)

George Horace Webb (8 October 1917 – 10 March 2010) was a British pianist considered by many as the father of the traditional jazz movement in Britain.

He grew up with a love of early jazz recordings, principally those made by the New Orleans musicians; and in his playing he tried to re-create the style of such bands as King Oliver's.

Webb "worked as a machine gun fitter in the Vickers-Armstrong factory at Crayford. The son of a former music hall artiste turned fishmonger, he was a keen jazz enthusiast and self-taught amateur pianist. He took it upon himself to organize lunchtime entertainment at the factory, assembling scratch bands from among the workers."

With his band, George Webb's Dixielanders, he played regularly at the Red Barn public house at Barnehurst, Kent, from the early 1940s. "No one has ever seriously challenged their claim to have been the first British revivalist jazz band". They made several recordings and BBC radio broadcasts. The Dixielanders disbanded in January 1948.

Webb was then part of Humphrey Lyttelton's band from September 1948 to June 1951. He reformed the Dixielanders in 1952, but this did not last long and he then concentrated on running a jazz club at the Shakespeare Hotel in Woolwich. From the mid-1960s he was an agent and manager for musicians. Early in the following decade, he returned to playing more frequently and toured Europe as a soloist. Another version of the Dixielanders operated from 1973 to 1974, and then Webb ran a pub in Essex for 12 years, the Kings Arms, Stansted. After moving back to Kent, Webb was a guest in various bands into the 2000s.

Among the musicians who played in the Dixielanders at various times were the British jazz trumpeter Humphrey Lyttelton, Wally Fawkes the clarinettist and Eddie Harvey the trombonist.

== Bibliography ==
- Gelly, Dave (2014). An Unholy Row: Jazz in Britain and its Audience 1945–1960. Sheffield: Equinox. ISBN 978-1-84553-712-8.
