= Wally Fawkes =

Canadian-British cartoonist and clarinettist (1924–2023)

- Self-portrait with his most famous creation, Flook
- Born: Walter Ernest Pearsall; 21 June 1924; Vancouver, Canada
- Died: 1 March 2023 (aged 98); London, England
- Other name: Trog
- Occupations: Newspaper cartoonist; Jazz clarinettist
- Notable work: Flook
- Spouses: Sandy Fawkes (m. 1949, divorced) Susan Clifford (m. 1965)
- Children: 6

Walter Ernest Fawkes (né Pearsall; 21 June 1924 – 1 March 2023), also known as Trog when signing cartoons, was a Canadian-British jazz clarinettist and satirical cartoonist.

After emigrating with his family to Britain from Canada when he was 7 years old, he taught himself the clarinet, and first joined a revivalist jazz band with George Webb in 1944. He later created a new, more mainstream band with friend Humphrey Lyttelton, and it soon became one of the leading British jazz bands of the 1950s.

Fawkes also achieved success illustrating cartoons under the pen name "Trog". His most notable work in this business was Flook, a comic strip which ran in The Daily Mail newspaper from 1949 to 1984. Initially aimed at children, the strip evolved over time into a gentle satire of British politics. When Flook ended he continued to illustrate until failing eyesight forced him to retire in 2005 at age 81, leaving him to concentrate solely on his clarinet playing.

== Early life ==
Fawkes was born on 21 June 1924, as Walter Ernest Pearsall in Vancouver, British Columbia. His father, Douglas Pearsall, was a Canadian railway clerk whom his mother, Mabel (née Ainsley), later left for Charles Fawkes, a British printer. Mabel took her children with Charles to Britain in 1931.

Enthused by comic books from a young age, Fawkes left school at 14 with a scholarship to study at Sidcup Art School, although he later left after 18 months due to financial restraints. On the outbreak of the Second World War, Fawkes was first employed painting camouflage on factory roofs to hide them from enemy bombing. A bout of pleurisy made Fawkes unfit for service and he was instead employed by the Coal Commission to work on maps of coal seams.

== Career ==
=== As a jazz musician ===
It was during the war years that Fawkes began playing in jazz bands. In 1947, he took a weekly course at the Camberwell School of Art in London where he met future friends Humphrey Lyttelton and Francis Wilford-Smith. Lyttelton would become a long-lasting close friend. Fawkes later joined George Webb's Dixielanders, a semi-professional revivalist jazz band that featured Lyttelton on trumpet, in 1944. When Lyttelton left the Dixielanders in January 1948 to form his own jazz band, Fawkes went with him and stayed there until 1956, by which time it had evolved past revivalism and became more mainstream. This suited Fawkes, as his own bands from then on could be broadly described as mainstream. He re-united with Lyttelton periodically thereafter, and, though highly talented on his instrument, remained (in the broadest sense of the term) an "amateur". He based his style on that of American jazz composer Sidney Bechet and once recorded with him and Louis Armstrong, as part of Lyttelton's band, in 1949. He played with George Melly and John Chilton in the Feetwarmers band in the early 1970s. After giving up illustrating in 2005, Fawkes continued to play in various bands, with one of his last performances being held in 2011.

=== As a cartoonist ===
Of all his talents, there is none I admire more than his outstanding skill as a caricaturist. Very few artists can see a likeness the way he can, and catch it so completely. He doesn't develop a hieroglyph for each politician and then simply reach for it each time it is needed. Every Trog caricature is carefully recrafted.

— Nicholas Garland

In 1942, he entered an art competition that was judged by the Daily Mail's chief cartoonist Leslie Illingworth, who found him work with the Clement Davies advertising agency. On Fawkes' 21st birthday in 1945, Illingworth found Fawkes work at the Daily Mail drawing column-breaks and decorative illustrations. He signed the drawings as Trog, which was short for Troglodyte which came from his days from World War II. He once joked that due to the amount of time spent in underground air-raid shelters people in London were becoming troglodytes. Fawkes was later inspired by this to adopt "Trog" as his pen-name.

In 1949, Fawkes's comic strip Flook first appeared in the Daily Mail, and was a success. It featured the unlikely and satirical adventures of its small and furry eponymous hero. Fawkes's role on the Mail was chiefly as illustrator, and he had a strong team of collaborators on the scripts for Flook over the years, including George Melly, Barry Norman, Humphrey Lyttelton and Barry Took. Flook ran for 35 years in the Daily Mail until its sudden cancellation in 1984. Margaret Thatcher once said that it was "quite the best commentary of the politics of the day". When the news broke that Fawkes was leaving the Mail he was signed up by Robert Maxwell, who in July 1984 had bought the Daily Mirror, from where Fawkes took Flook. It then transferred briefly to the Sunday Mirror before being dropped completely.

Fawkes also produced political cartoons for The Spectator with George Melly as his author. The two also contributed occasionally to Private Eye and, beginning in 1962, to the New Statesman. Despite producing larger political cartoons for the Daily Mail, his future role as Illingworth's successor as lead cartoonist was threatened by the paper's preference for the work of Gerald Scarfe. Fawkes therefore began submitting work to other publications, and he began contributing political cartoons to The Observer. At The Observer he fell foul of the readership when readers complained that some of his cartoons about the British royalty were "grossly discourteous to the Queen". In 1967 Scarfe left the Mail and Fawkes' position at the paper became more secure, and in 1968 he stopped writing for The Observer to focus solely on the Mail.

Fawkes became the Daily Mail's political cartoonist when Illingworth retired in 1969. That year he also replaced Illingworth as political cartoonist of Punch. In 1971, the Daily Mail absorbed the Daily Sketch, and the role of transforming the old paper from a broadsheet into a tabloid fell to the old Sketch editor Sir David English, who gave the role of political cartoonist to Stan McMurtry and Fawkes was dropped from his old role. Fawkes returned to The Observer in 1971 and continued to work for Punch. After Flook was cancelled in 1985, Fawkes worked briefly for Today and then served a short stint at the London Daily News. During the 1980s he continued to contribute to Punch and Private Eye, and for The Observer he drew a pocket cartoon named "mini-Trog". In 1996 he left The Observer and joined The Sunday Telegraph, where he remained until failing eyesight forced him to retire in 2005.

In 2013 his work was celebrated with an exhibition at the Cartoon Museum of London.

== Personal life ==
In 1949 Fawkes married the journalist Sandy Fawkes, who later became known for surviving an affair with the American serial killer Paul John Knowles. They had four children together, one of whom died of SIDS (cot death). In 1965, he married Susan Clifford – daughter of the Australian composer Hubert Clifford – and they had two children.

Fawkes died in London on 1 March 2023, at age 98, following a short illness.
