= Dream of Reason =

Studio album by The Cairos
- Released: May 2014
- Recorded: 2013
- Genre: Indie rock
- Length: 34:54
- Label: Island Records Australia
- Producer: Nick DiDia

The Cairos chronology
Colours Like Features (2012)	Dream of Reason (2014)

Dream of Reason is the debut and only studio album by Australian indie rock band, the Cairos, which was recorded in 2013 and released on the Island Records Australia label in May 2014. It appeared at No. 6 on the ARIA Hitseekers Albums chart.

== Reception ==
Professional ratings
Review scores
Source	Rating
Rolling Stone Australia	3.5/4 stars

Reviewed in Rolling Stone Australia at the time of release, Samuel J Fell rated Dream of Reason at three-and-a-half out-of four stars and explained, "The much anticipated debut LP from the Cairos is an epic sprawl of an album, a tour de force... these songs build and build before breaking over you, a strong psych flavour at the fore, they differ in that these tracks are somewhat gentler and more fluid. A bit more warmth has also been included." Milly Schultz-Boylen of the AU Review gave it 7.4 out-of 10 and found its tracks, "are well crafted, diverse and boast a sense of maturity that most debuts tend to lack."

== Track listing ==
1. "Obsession" (Jacob Trotter, Alistar Richardson, Alfio Alivuzza, Reuben Schafer) – 3:46
2. "Two Weeks of Eternity" (Trotter, Richardson, Alivuzza, Schafer) – 3:31
3. "Imaginations" (Trotter, Richardson, Alivuzza, Schafer) – 3:09
4. "Desire" (Trotter, Richardson, Alivuzza, Schafer) – 3:28
5. "Row of Homes" (Trotter, Richardson, Alivuzza, Schafer) – 3:35
6. "Insane" (Trotter, Richardson, Alivuzza, Schafer) – 3:34
7. "Fear of Madness" (Michael Bylund-Cloonan, Richardson, Alivuzza, Schafer) – 4:26
8. "Reasons" (Trotter, Richardson, Alivuzza, Schafer) – 3:10
9. "Good Days" (Trotter, Richardson, Alivuzza, Schafer) – 4:42
10. "Perspective" (Trotter, Richardson, Alivuzza, Schafer) – 3:34

Credits:

== Personnel ==
- Alistar Richardson – vocals, guitar, piano
- Alfio Alivuzza – vocals, lead guitar, computers
- Jacob Trotter – drums, percussion
- Reuben Schafer – bass
- Dayne Wotton – trumpet
- Aurora Richardson – vocals
- DJ Sammy T – vibes
- Felipe Macia – ping pong
- Nick Didia – producer, "There's Been Surveys"
