= Sue Richardson =

English jazz singer, trumpet player, composer and educator

Sue Richardson is an English jazz singer, trumpet player, composer and educator born in Dunstable, Bedfordshire, England.

== Biography ==
She grew up in Bedfordshire and was involved in music through the county's free music education. She received trumpet lessons and attended a Saturday music school in Dunstable. She attended Northfields Upper School in Dunstable in the 1980s and joined their bigband. George Chisholm was the band's president and they played many concerts with him. In 1986 the visited the World Expo in Vancouver, Canada and played for Margaret Thatcher. On leaving school, Richardson joined the BBC Symphony Chorus, singing at events such as the Last Night of the Proms and Christmas Carols on Blue Peter.

She attended Goldsmiths College (University of London) and gained a BMus(Hons). She currently resides in Seaford, East Sussex, with her husband and son.

== Career ==
In 1995, she married pianist Neal Richardson and embarked on a professional music career. First working on cruise ships and hotel residencies around the world and later returning to the UK and forming her own jazz quintet which she writes and arranges for.

In 2002 she was a finalist in The Marion Montgomery Awards at The Jazz Divas Festival on the Isle of Wight. In 2004, Richardson toured with Liane Carroll in the UK, playing support and released her first album Out of a Song (SPR002CD) on Splash Point Records. In 2007, she released Emergence (SPR006CD)

Richardson plays Eclipse trumpets and is an endorsee. Her trumpets are embellished with 24 carat gold flowers.

In 2008, Richardson was featured on Ian Shaw's release of Sad Sweet Song (SPR011SG), a tribute to the late Humphrey Lyttelton. As a result, Richardson became guest trumpet player with the Humphrey Lyttelton band, appearing at the Hammersmith Apollo for the concert celebrating his life.

In 2011, Richardson released her third album, Fanfare (SPR010CD). It was reviewed in The Observer by Dave Gelly who commented that she is "no mere gimmick". The launch concert was reviewed in The Times by Clive Davis. "her timbre is warm and full-bodied - her soloing, while avoiding high-note theatrics, evokes the generosity and exuberance of players from the swing era."

In April 2025 Sue was awarded her Doctorate having submitted her Thesis "Towards an innovative, bespoke pedagogy to enhance the delivery of Higher Popular Music Education in the UK: a focused, single-institution study" in October 2023.

== Discography ==
- 2004 Out of a Song
- 2007 Emergence
- 2008 Sad Sweet Song (Guest appearance on Ian Shaw's "Sad Sweet Song")
- 2011 Fanfare
- 2013 Too Cool

=== Media ===
- Sue Richardson's Fanfare reviewed in The Observer, February 2011
- Sue Richardson's launch concert for Fanfare reviewed in The Times, February 2011
- Sue Richardson interviewed and performing on BBC Radio 4's Woman's Hour, March 2010
- Sue Richardson interviewed on France 24 TV, May 2010
