= Karen Sharp =

Karen Sharp (born Ipswich) is a musician who plays tenor saxophone, baritone saxophone and clarinet. She is best known for her former membership of Humphrey Lyttelton's eight-piece jazz band.

She has released four albums under her own name – Till There Was You in 2002, So Far So Good in 2004, Wait And See in 2007 and Spirit in 2011.

== Literature ==
- John Chilton: Who’s Who of British Jazz. Continuum, London 2004, ISBN 0-8264-7234-6.
