= Flook (comic strip) =

British newspaper comic strip

Flook was a British comic strip which ran from 1949 to 1984 in the Daily Mail newspaper. It was drawn by Wally Fawkes (of the jazz group Wally Fawkes and the Troglodytes), who signed the strips as "Trog".

It was the first newspaper comic strip to be published by the New Zealand newspaper Otago Daily Times, where it ran from 1952 to 1979. In North America, the strip was syndicated via the General Features Corporation. Fawkes drew a revised 'origin story' for Flook's North American debut, eliminating much of the strip's first six month run. It ran in North American newspapers between 10 September 1951 and 15 October 1954, at which point the last paper to run it, the Vancouver Province, discontinued it mid-story.

== Characters and story ==
The central characters were a young boy called Rufus and his magical animal friend, Flook. According to the strip 'The Coming of Flook', which forms part of the cartoon book Rufus and Flook v. Moses Maggot, we learn that Flook, who vaguely resembled a furry pig walking on his hind legs, was a creature from the age of the dinosaurs whom a lonely boy, Rufus, rescued from cavemen in a dream and who then came back to waking reality with him. Flook was able to talk (in seven languages) and had a fine sense of irony with which to temper Rufus' innocence and enthusiasm. He was also able to change shape into all manner of objects, though this power was mentioned less often after the first couple of years of the strip. They inhabited a satirical and socially perceptive fantasy world not unrelated to contemporary Great Britain, populated by larger-than-life characters, mostly bearing a striking resemblance to leading politicians and celebrities. Many of their adventures starred their principal adversaries, the villainous Moses Maggot (who, for the purposes of North American syndication, was renamed Mossy Mildew) and his sidekick, the gaolbird Douglas Bodger, whose sister – the overweight teenage witch Lucretia Bodger (a play on Lucretia Borgia), with her cat, Gobstopper – also appeared quite frequently, as did a mad retired colonel.

== Scripts ==
The strip was initially written by Douglas Mount, a Daily Mail employee. Mount left the Mail with little warning and subsequently the strip's authorship was taken up by the Australian journalist Robert Raymond. In his memoir Giving Luck a Chance, Raymond describes the way in which Fawkes brought him on board as Flook's author in 1949. Fawkes invited Raymond into his office, where he was being harassed by telephone calls from the production team for the latest daily instalment of the strip. Raymond himself was unemployed at the time:

'Ever written the script for a strip?' Wally enquired casually.

'Can't say I have.'

'Want to have a go? It pays quite well. Seven guineas a week, probably.'

He immediately had all my attention.

[...]

I tried to think of all the strips I had ever read. I knew that if I got the Mail out of this jam the scriptwriting job was mine. I paced up and down a few times.

'Right! Here's what we do. The old boy says: Make yourselves at home while I'm away, boys, but - '

The phone rang again.

'Leave the receiver off', said Wally, glancing at the clock and starting to letter the caption in the balloon. 'But what?'

'-BUT STAY OUT OF THE EAST WING!'

'Great!' said Wally, lettering rapidly. 'What's in the East Wing?'

'I haven't any idea,' I said, 'but give me a day or so and I'll think of something'.

Following Raymond's departure in 1953, authors were Compton Mackenzie, singer and writer George Melly, the comedian Barry Took, the musician Humphrey Lyttelton and the film critic Barry Norman. Several book-length episodes and compilations were published, and the Daily Mail also marketed a Flook toy.

The ironic and bohemian ethos that the strip came to develop was notably at variance with the conservatism of the Daily Mail, which finally discontinued it after some 10,000 episodes, reportedly because the editor, David English, objected to its repeated jabs at the Prime Minister, Margaret Thatcher (though she is said to have enjoyed it), and the strip's covert criticism of the Mail's championing of the cause of Zola Budd. After it was dropped by the Mail, Flook scripted by Keith Waterhouse (shortly before he moved to the Mail) ran in the Daily Mirror starting in 19 November 1984 until 15 November 1985 before switching to the Sunday Mirror.

Flook was adopted as a mascot by 831 Squadron, Fleet Air Arm, and the character was painted on the squadron aircraft.

== Books ==
- The Amazing Adventures of Rufus and Flook 1949
- Rufus and Flook v. Moses Maggot 1950
- Rufus and Flook at School 1951
- Flook 1958 (collection of three stories)
- Flook: Flook's Eye View of the Sixties, with an introduction by Laurie Lee, 1970 (collection of four stories)
- Flook and the Peasants' Revolt 1975
- Trog: Forty Graphic Years 1987 (features one complete “Flook” story)
- I, Flook: An Autobiography by George Melly, 1962 (not a strip collection)
- Trog at 30: A Celebration, Centre for the Study of Cartoons and Caricature, University of Kent at Canterbury, 1979 (catalogue accompanying an exhibit, with essays by most of the writers of “Flook” up to date)

== Essay ==
- Kevin Jackson, "The Pataphysical Flook" 2007 (an essay about Melly’s references to the works of Alfred Jarry in Flook)
