= The Beau Hunks =

- Origin: Netherlands
- Genres: Jazz, swing
- Years active: 1992–present
- Labels: Basta, EigenWijs, Koch Screen, Movies Select Audio

The Beau Hunks are a Dutch revivalist music ensemble who have performed and recorded the vintage works of composers Leroy Shield, Marvin Hatley, Raymond Scott, Edward MacDowell, Ferde Grofé, and others. They have been referred to as a "documentary orchestra", because they perform note-perfect renditions of music which is obscure and often commercially unavailable. For some projects for which no sheet music was known to exist, they had to reconstruct charts from original recordings extracted from films.

For various projects they have been reconfigured as The Beau Hunks Sextette, The Beau Hunks Saxophone Soctette, The Beau Hunks Saxophone Quartet, and The Beau Hunks Orchestra. They have recorded for the labels Movies Select Audio, EigenWijs (a division of the VPRO, the Dutch public broadcasting network), Basta Audio-Visuals, and Koch Screen.

== Hal Roach Film Music projects ==
The Beau Hunks Orchestra was originally a quintet organized to perform soundtrack themes from Hal Roach film studio comedies of the 1930s, including those of Laurel & Hardy, Our Gang, The Little Rascals, Charley Chase, Thelma Todd, and the Taxi Boys. The group (whose name derives from a 1931 Laurel and Hardy film Beau Hunks) gave what was intended to be their only public performance on 18 January 1992, at the Oliver Hardy centennial in Amsterdam. However, based on the success of the performance, the band decided to expand to a full orchestra and record their repertoire for commercial CD release.

The Roach film music, composed mostly by Leroy Shield (without screen credit), with additional songs and cues by T. Marvin Hatley, was publicly familiar, but had never been commercially released, and the original recordings and scores were presumed lost. In the mid-1980s, Piet Schreuders, a Dutch graphic designer and radio programmer, began assembling a tape library of Hal Roach comedy themes, transferred directly from the soundtrack of VHS tapes. Because the films contain dialogue and sound effects which occasionally obscure the music, Schreuders isolated fragments of themes without dialogue or sound effects and edited them into complete, uninterrupted versions. "Nobody had the original masters of these songs," Schreuders told The New York Times in 1994. "The music wasn't available anywhere else except in the films themselves, where they could only be heard in short segments. Luckily, each song was used so many times that it was theoretically possible, given enough time and patience, to splice [each] song together."

Using these reconstructed recordings, Schreuders worked closely with transcribers and arrangers Peter Stöve, Jan Robijns, Robert Veen, and Menno Daams to perfect written charts to accurately reflect the music heard in the films. Recreations of these themes had been attempted by others, including Robert Crumb's band R. Crumb & His Cheap Suit Serenaders (1970s), Ronnie Hazlehurst (1980s), and Vince Giordano (1990s). The Beau Hunks, however, finally gave the stock music of Shield its due in a series of albums released between 1992 and 2000. The most popular of the releases was The Beau Hunks Play the Little Rascals Music (1995).

In 2000, the Beau Hunks collaborated with the Metropole Orchestra to re-create the soundtrack to the 1936 Laurel and Hardy comedy Our Relations. A collection of original sheet music from Hal Roach films had been discovered in a Los Angeles archive in 1994 and 1995. This collection yielded Leroy Shield's notes for the score of Our Relations.

Piet Schreuders studied the sheet music, identified dozens of individual themes and compared them with titles and lead sheets found in the Music Division of the Library of Congress. Using the 1936 film soundtrack as a reference, Beau Hunks arrangers transcribed themes for which no written parts could be found. As a result of this work, about 95% of the original film score could be reconstructed. Schreuders subsequently discovered that much of Shield's score for this film never made it into the released version, having ended up on the cutting room floor during post-production. Deleted were elements such as the overture, musical transitions, musical effects, and variations which unified the score as a whole. The Beau Hunks recording represents the first time in history the original Our Relations film score could be heard as Shield composed it.

== Other projects ==
Following the commercial and critical success of their 1992/93 Shield restorations, the Beau Hunks undertook recording projects involving forgotten but, in their estimation, historic works by American composers. These include Raymond Scott (particularly his 1937–39 six-man "Quintette", and the Paul Whiteman Orchestra's symphonic 1937/38 "Chesterfield Arrangements" of Quintette repertoire); Ferde Grofé (Broadway At Night; Mississippi Suite; Three Shades of Blue; and Metropolis); Edward MacDowell (Woodland Sketches); and various American pioneers of the jazz saxophone.

The Beau Hunks have also recorded an album with legendary jazz saxophonist Al Gallodoro.

== Founders and project coordinators ==
The co-founders of the Beau Hunks are Piet Schreuders and Gert-Jan Blom, both of Amsterdam. Blom, a bass player and producer, serves as bandleader, session contractor, and recording producer. Schreuders serves as researcher, project developer, liner note annotator, package designer, and occasional co-producer.

== Discography ==
As the Beau Hunks Orchestra:

- The Beau Hunks Play the Original Laurel & Hardy Music, Vol. 1 (Movies Select Audio, 1992; Basta 1995)
- "The Curse of an Aching Heart" CD single (Movies Select Audio, 1992)
- "Gangway Charlie" CD single (Movies Select Audio, 1993)
- The Beau Hunks Play the Original Laurel & Hardy Music, Vol. 2 (Movies Select Audio, 1993; Basta 1995)
- The Beau Hunks Play the Little Rascals Music (Koch Screen, 1995)
- On to the Show: The Beau Hunks Play More Little Rascals Music (Basta, 1995)
- Edward McDowell's Woodland Sketches (Basta, 1997)
- Modern American Music of Ferde Grofé (Basta, 1998)

As the Beau Hunks Sextette:

- Celebration on the Planet Mars: A Tribute to Raymond Scott (EigenWijs, 1994, band identified as The Wooden Indians; 1996, Basta, as The Beau Hunks Sextette )
- Manhattan Minuet: The Music of Raymond Scott (Basta, 1996)

As the Beau Hunks Saxophone Soctette:

- The Beau Hunks Saxophone Soctette (Basta, 1998)
- Contrasts (Basta, 2003)

As the Beau Hunks Saxophone Quartet:

- Styles and Chuckles (Basta, 2010)

The Beau Hunks with the Metropole Orchestra:

- Leroy Shield's Our Relations: The Lost Laurel & Hardy Music (Basta, 2000)
- Raymond Scott: The Chesterfield Arrangements, 1937–38 (Basta, 1999)

Al Gallodoro with The Beau Hunks:

- Out of Nowhere (Basta, 1999)

Ronald Jansen Heijtmajer with The Beau Hunks:

- Fingerbustin': Novelty & Swing for the Saxophone (EigenWijs, 1995; Basta 1996)
