= Paul John Knowles =

American serial killer (1946–1974)

- Knowles after his arrest in 1974
- Born: April 25, 1946; Orlando, Florida, United States
- Died: December 18, 1974 (aged 28); Douglas County, Georgia, United States
- Cause of death: Gunshot wounds
- Other name: The Casanova Killer

Details
- Victims: 18–35+
- Span of crimes: July 26, 1974 – November 16, 1974
- Country: United States
- States: Connecticut, Florida, Ohio, Nevada, Texas, Alabama, Virginia, Georgia
- Date apprehended: November 17, 1974

Paul John Knowles (April 25, 1946 – December 18, 1974), also known as The Casanova Killer, was an American spree and serial killer tied to the deaths of 18 people in 1974, although he claimed at least 35.

== Early life ==
Paul Knowles was born in Orlando, Florida, on April 25, 1946, to Thomas Jefferson Knowles and Bonnie Strickland. Knowles lived in foster homes and was on multiple occasions sent to the notorious Florida School for Boys before first being incarcerated at the age of 19. In early 1974, Knowles was serving time at Raiford Prison in Florida (now known as Florida State Prison) when he began corresponding with a divorcee named Angela Covic in San Francisco, eventually becoming engaged. His fiancée paid for his legal counsel and, upon his release, Knowles flew directly to California to be with her, but she called off the wedding. The woman said Knowles projected an "aura of fear" that terrified her. Knowles claimed to have murdered three people on the streets of San Francisco that night, but that has never been verified. Knowles returned to Jacksonville, Florida, where his parents lived. He was arrested on July 26, 1974, after assaulting a bartender in Jacksonville Beach but escaped from a temporary detention cell after kicking out a wire mesh door.

== Crime spree ==
After his escape from police custody, Knowles began a four-month, multistate crime spree. At the time, the crimes were not linked but after Knowles' capture authorities discovered he had recorded audiotaped confessions that he mailed to an attorney. These tapes were never released to the public, but were reviewed by a grand jury in 1975. The tapes, along with all transcripts, were destroyed "after being ruined beyond repair in a flood of the Federal Courthouse in Macon," according to the Georgia Bureau of Investigation.

- On the night of his escape from police custody on July 26, 1974, Knowles broke into the Jacksonville Beach home of 65-year-old Alice Heneritta Curtis, beat her, ransacked her home for money and valuables, then stole her car. Curtis, a retired schoolteacher, died from her injuries.
- In his taped confessions, Knowles claimed to have murdered a teenage girl named "Alma." On December 21, the Georgia Bureau of Investigation identified this victim as 13-year-old Ima Jean Sanders, who disappeared on August 1, 1974, in Warner Robins, Georgia, and whose skeletal remains were found in April 1976.
- Knowles claimed to have kidnapped and killed 11-year-old Lillian Annette Anderson and 7-year-old Mylette Josephine Anderson outside of Jacksonville, Florida, on August 1, 1974. Although the girls' disappearance was never solved, investigators have said they believe this was a false confession.
- On August 2, 1974, Knowles murdered Marjorie Evelyn Howie, 49, in Atlantic Beach, Florida. The married mother of two was found strangled in her Selva Marina home that morning and her television was stolen.
- On August 23, 1974, Knowles forced his way into the home of 24-year-old Kathie Sue Pierce in Musella, Georgia. Knowles strangled Pierce, but left her 3-year-old son physically unharmed.
- On September 3, 1974, 32-year-old William Bates was seen with a redheaded man at Scott's Inn, a roadside pub near Lima, Ohio. Bates' wife reported him missing. Near the bar, police found Curtis's vehicle abandoned but Bates' car was missing. In October, Bates' nude body was found. He had been strangled and dumped in the woods.
- Now driving Bates' car, Knowles bound and killed two campers, 62-year-old Emmett Alexander Johnson and 59-year-old Lois Mildred Johnson, at a rest stop near Ely, Nevada on September 18, 1974.
- 42-year-old Ebon Charlynn Hicks was reported missing by family on September 22, 1974. Her body was found discarded beside the road on September 25, 1974, near a rest stop outside of Seguin, Texas. Her vehicle was found at the rest stop. She had been raped and strangled.
- Knowles appears to have met 49-year-old beautician Ann Jean Dawson on September 23, 1974, in Birmingham, Alabama. It is unclear as to whether he abducted her or if she traveled with him willingly, but she paid the bills while they traveled together. Knowles claimed that he killed Dawson on September 29, 1974, and threw her body into the Mississippi River. Her remains were found in Mississippi on November 15, 1977, by two squirrel hunters.
- On October 16, 1974, 35-year-old Karen Wine and her 16-year-old daughter Dawn Marie Wine were both bound, raped and strangled after their Marlborough, Connecticut, home was broken into. The only thing found missing from their home was a tape recorder. Authorities say that Knowles was the perpetrator.
- On October 18, 1974, 53-year-old Doris Hosey was shot to death with her husband's rifle. The gun was placed beside her body.
- Knowles picked up two hitchhikers in Key West, Florida and was stopped by a policeman. Knowles was driving a car stolen from victim Bates, but the officer let Knowles go with a warning. Shaken by the experience, Knowles dropped off the hitchhikers in Miami, Florida without harming them. Around this time, Knowles recorded audiotaped confessions to crimes, mailing them to a lawyer in Florida.
- On November 2, 23-year-old Edward Hillard and 20-year-old Debbie Griffin disappeared while hitchhiking near Macon, Georgia. Hillard's body was found in nearby woods, while Griffin's remains were found in Crawford County, Georgia, on August 29, 1975. Knowles is reportedly suspected in their murders.
- On November 6, 1974, in Milledgeville, Georgia, Knowles befriended 45-year-old Carswell Hall Carr Sr. and was invited back to Carr's house to spend the night. He stabbed Carr to death and strangled Carr's 15-year-old daughter, Amanda Beth Carr, and attempted necrophilia with the teenager's body.
- On November 8, Knowles met 45-year-old British journalist Sandy Fawkes in Atlanta. Fawkes said that he impressed her with his looks which were a "cross between Robert Redford and Ryan O'Neal." The pair spent the next few days together, but Fawkes said Knowles was unable to perform when they attempted to have sex. They parted ways on November 10. The next day, Knowles picked up Susan MacKenzie, an acquaintance of Fawkes and demanded sex from her at gunpoint. She escaped and notified the police. When patrolmen tried to apprehend him, Knowles brandished a sawed-off shotgun and made his escape.
- On November 14, in West Palm Beach, Florida, he invaded the home of invalid Beverly Mabee, where he abducted her sister, 32-year-old Barbara Mabee Abel, and stole their car. From there, he traveled to Fort Pierce, Florida, arriving the following night. As Barbara later publicized in her book ONE SURVIVOR, she was raped during her captivity before Knowles released her.
- On the morning of November 16, 35-year-old Florida Highway Patrol Trooper Charles Eugene Campbell recognized the stolen car near Perry, Florida. Knowles was able to wrestle the officer's pistol away from him and, taking Campbell hostage, drove away in the patrol car. Knowles used the police siren to stop a 29-year-old motorist named James Meyer, putting both hostages in Meyer's car. Knowles took the two men into a wooded area in Pulaski County, Georgia, and handcuffed them to a tree before shooting each of them in the head at close range.

== Capture ==
Shortly after murdering Campbell and Meyer, Knowles became involved in a car chase with Henry County Sheriff's Deputy Charles Hancock. He eventually crashed the car through a police roadblock in Henry County, Georgia and Officer Jerry Key was injured when Knowles' stolen car crashed into his patrol car. Knowles escaped the vehicle on foot, firing several shots at the pursuing officers. A lengthy and chaotic foot chase ensued, with Knowles pursued by dogs, law enforcement officers from several agencies, and helicopters. Knowles was shot in the foot by Chief Detective Philip Howard during the foot chase, before finally being cornered on November 17, 1974, by David Clark, a 27-year-old Vietnam War veteran and hospital maintenance worker. Clark, who happened to be out hunting with a shotgun at the time, held Knowles at gunpoint until Henry County investigators Paul Robbins and Billy Payne arrived on the scene. Robbins and Payne arrested and handcuffed Knowles, who was outside of the perimeter established for the formal manhunt and might well have escaped if not for Clark's intervention.

== Death ==
On December 18, 1974, Sheriff Earl Lee and Agent Ronnie Angel from the Georgia Bureau of Investigation were traveling down Interstate 20 with Knowles, who was handcuffed in the back seat. Their destination was Henry County, Georgia, where Knowles had, per a Georgia Bureau of Investigation press release, admitted to dumping a handgun he had taken from Florida State Trooper Charles Eugene Campbell, after killing him with it. The Georgia Bureau of Investigation reported, "Knowles grabbed Lee's handgun, discharging it through the holster in the process and while Lee was struggling with Knowles and attempting to keep control of the vehicle, Angel fired three shots into Knowles' chest, killing him instantly."

== See also ==
- List of serial killers in the United States
- List of serial killers by number of victims

== Bibliography ==
- Sandy Fawkes, Killing Time, 1977, Taplinger Publishing Co, London
- Sandy Fawkes, Natural Born Killer: In Love and on the Road with a Serial Killer, 2004, John Blake Publishing, London
- Georgina Lloyd, One was not enough, 1976, London
