= Revivalist artist =

A revivalist artist or revivalist band is a musical group, singer, or musician dedicated to reviving interest in a musical genre from an earlier era.

== Overview ==
Such performers are usually dedicated enthusiasts of a particular musical genre – often a style that is no longer in vogue – and act as evangelists to spread awareness and appreciation of that music to new audiences. Most such acts do this by live performances at a variety of venues.

Unlike tribute acts who are usually dedicated to recreating material associated with just one primary artist (such as Elvis Presley or The Beatles) as a nostalgic entertainment, revivalist artists tend to draw on material from a wide range of artists and writers from the chosen musical genre.

Unlike cover bands who are primarily populist entertainers playing cover versions of popular hit songs to satisfy audience enjoyment of familiar music, revivalist artists usually see themselves as performers with a musical mission to revive a cherished genre. They often draw from a much broader repertoire of music than just the obvious hit songs of an era. Sometimes the mission includes drawing the audience's attention to forgotten or overlooked songs from the genre as well as the better-known hits.

Most revivalist artists focus on performing material only from the original era that they are reviving. They replenish their repertoire by digging deeper in the catalogue of music from their chosen genre. Some artists eventually aspire to write new material in a similar style and become known for their own compositions.

== List of notable revivalist artists ==
- The Beau Hunks – Dutch orchestra who have recorded overlooked works by American composers Raymond Scott, Leroy Shield, Ferde Grofe, Edward McDowell, and others, as well as reconstructing and recording themes from Hal Roach 1930s film comedies.
- Big Bad Voodoo Daddy – one of the major swing revival bands
- The Black Crowes – started in 1984 as revivalists of 1970s blues-rock – eventually became writers of their own material
- The Blues Brothers – started in 1978 as revivalists of 1950s and 1960s blues, soul and R&B music
- Michael Feinstein – began his performing career in 1986 as a revivalist of the genre of American songs written between 1920–1960 (known colloquially as the Great American Songbook)
- The Jam – started in 1972 and evolved into the leading band of the late-1970s mod revival
- Imelda May – Irish singer noted as a revivalist of rockabilly in the 2000s
- Pete Seeger, along with his associated act The Weavers, revitalized American folk music in the 1940s and 1950s.
- Leon Redbone – singer-songwriter, guitarist, and actor specializing in jazz, blues, and Tin Pan Alley classics.
- Joshua Rifkin – played a central role in the ragtime revival in the 1970s by treating the works of Scott Joplin as serious classical music rather than as nostalgia or novelty
- Sha Na Na – started in 1969 as revivalists of 1950s doo-wop music
- The Sheepdogs – started in 2007 as revivalists of early-1970's roots rock
- Simple Plan – Canadian band that was noted as punk rock revival
- Steel Panther – formed in 2000 as revivalists and a parody of the 1980s 'glam metal' scene.
- The Stray Cats – a major player in the rockabilly revival of the early 1980s
- Tiny Tim – performed historic and regional American music in his natural baritone, in addition to novelty songs sung falsetto.
- Cedric Watson has helped to revive Creole music.

== See also ==
- Rock and roll revival
