= Pat Smythe (pianist) =

Scottish jazz musician (1923–1983)

Patrick Mungo Smythe (2 May 1923 – 6 May 1983) was a Scottish jazz pianist who rose to prominence as a member of the Joe Harriott Quintet during the 1960s.

== Early life ==
Smythe was born in Edinburgh, Scotland, the son of an Edinburgh solicitor. He was educated at Winchester College and went on to study law at Oxford University. The Second World War interrupted his studies, as he enlisted with the Royal Air Force, serving for five years as a night-fighter pilot. After the war, he resumed his legal studies, this time at the University of Edinburgh, where he was also recognised as a talented classical and jazz pianist. After graduating, he spent several years in his father's law firm, before leaving Edinburgh for London, England, in the late 1950s in search of a professional career in music.

== Joe Harriott ==
After working briefly with the Jamaican trumpeter Dizzy Reece, in May 1960 he joined the quintet led by another Jamaican, alto saxophonist Joe Harriott. Harriott was in the process of reshaping his band in order to begin playing his revolutionary brand of free jazz, and recruited Smythe specifically for his willingness and ability to play this music, which was unheard of in Europe at the time. Smythe's graceful, lyrical phrases were the perfect complement to Harriott's increasingly abstract playing, and also to the explosive trumpet and flügelhorn of Shake Keane. Smythe, bassist Coleridge Goode and drummers Phil Seamen and (later) Bobby Orr combined to bring full realisation to Harriott's conception of complete ensemble interaction, at the expense of traditional roles of soloist and accompanist. Smythe's pivotal role highlighted one of the principal differences between Harriott and his American counterpart Ornette Coleman, who viewed the harmonic qualities of the piano as incompatible with his own brand of free improvisation.

The Harriott quintet stayed together until 1965, recording three albums (Free Form, Abstract, and Movement) while also holding a long-term residency at the Marquee Club in Soho. Smythe stayed with Harriott after the dissolution of the quintet, becoming a key member of the group Indo-Jazz Fusions, co-led by Harriott and the Indian composer and violinist John Mayer. This double quintet of five Indian and five jazz musicians aimed to fuse Indian raga structures with jazz improvisation, performing and recording extensively until Harriott's departure ended the project in 1969. With his knowledge of Indian ragas, Smythe was considered by Mayer to be the bridge between the two camps.

== Later career and legacy ==
In a diverse career, Smythe worked and recorded with many other jazz musicians when they passed through Britain, including Stan Getz, Paul Gonsalves, Ben Webster, Eddie Lockjaw Davis, Zoot Sims and Bob Brookmeyer. He worked mainly as an accompanist in the London clubs throughout the 1970s, helping bring Scottish jazz vocalist Carol Kidd to prominence. After a long illness, he died in 1983 in London, England, at the age of 60. The Pat Smythe Memorial Trust was established two years later, as a registered charity to provide financial awards to young jazz musicians of outstanding talent. It was funded entirely from benefit concerts and gave awards to such musicians as Julian Arguelles, Jason Rebello, Nigel Hitchcock and Richard Fairhurst. The trust ran from 1985 to 2005, and is now defunct.

== Discography ==
=== As leader ===
- UK Live: with Eddie Davis & Harold McNair 1967 Vol. 1 (Jazzhus Disk, 2012)
- UK Live: with Eddie Davis & Harold McNair 1967 Vol. 2 (Jazzhus Disk, 2012)

=== As sideman ===
With Joe Harriott

- Free Form (Jazzland, 1961)
- Abstract (Capitol, 1963)
- Movement (Columbia, 1964)
- High Spirits (Columbia, 1965)
- Personal Portrait (Columbia, 1968)
- Swings High (Melodisc, 1970)
- Genius (Jazz Academy 2000)
- BBC Jazz for Moderns (Gearbox, 2009)
- Journey (Moonlight Tunes, 2011)
- Indo-Jazz Suite with John Mayer (Columbia, 1966)
- Indo-Jazz Fusions with John Mayer (Columbia, 1967)
- Indo-Jazz Fusions II with John Mayer (Columbia, 1968)

With others

- Elaine Delmar, Elaine Delmar and Friends (Polydor, 1980)
- Paul Gonsalves, Boom-Jackie-Boom-Chick (Vocalion, 1964)
- Shake Keane, That's the Noise (Ace of Clubs, 1967)
- The King's Singers, Swing (EMI, 1976)
- Gilles Peterson, Impressed 2 (Universal, 2004)

== See also ==
- List of jazz pianists
- List of Scottish musicians
