= Frank Holder (musician) =

Guyanese singer and percussionist (1925–2017)

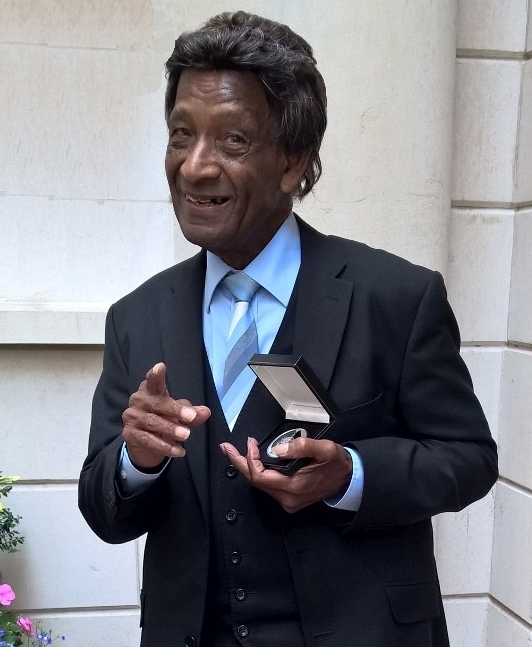
- Holder with his Life-Time Achievement Award from The Worshipful Company of Musicians

Background information
- Born: Frank Claude Herman Holder; 2 April 1925; Georgetown, Guyana
- Died: 29 October 2017 (aged 92) Carshalton, London, England
- Genres: Jazz, Latin
- Occupation: Musician
- Instruments: Vocals, bongos, congas
- Labels: Parlophone, Decca, Pye, London, Esquire, Metronome, Dawn, BBC discs, Mainstem

Frank Claude Herman Holder (2 April 1925 – 29 October 2017) was a Guyanese jazz singer and percussionist. He was a member of bands led by Jiver Hutchinson, Johnny Dankworth and Joe Harriott.

== Early life ==
Frank Holder was born in 1925 in Georgetown, Guyana, and served in the Royal Air Force. He sang in forces groups at RAF Cranwell, including a band led by Geoff Head.

== Career ==
=== 1940s and 1950s ===
Holder played with bands led by Andre Messeder and John Carioca in the late 1940s, appearing with the latter at Churchill's Club in London. He also performed at the Feldman Swing Club (100 Club) in London, owned by the Feldman brothers. Holder recalled, "At Feldman's, a black man would be accepted when you couldn't appear at clubs like the Mayfair or Embassy. Black guys like Coleridge Goode and Ray Ellington were welcome, and all that mattered to Robert and Monty Feldman was that you were a musician". At the time, he occasionally worked with Victor Feldman.

In his early years, Holder recorded for Parlophone and Decca Records. He was perhaps best known for his work in the early 1950s with the Dankworth Seven led by John Dankworth, which often topped the Melody Maker Jazz charts. Holder is also regarded as one of the leading black UK jazz musicians to emerge from the mid-1940s swing dance band movement, having got his big break with a band led by Jiver Hutchinson after World War II. In the late 1940s, Holder worked with trumpeter Kenny Baker.

Highlights from Holder's Dankworth days include an appearance at the Royal Albert Hall on the same bill as Nat King Cole. Throughout the 1950s and 1960s, Holder toured, recorded, and performed with Ronnie Scott, Tubby Hayes, Don Rendell, Peter King, Dickie Hawdon, Eddie Harvey, Jack Fallon, Harry Beckett, Bill Le Sage, Shake Keane, Ronnie Ross, Coleridge Goode, Hank Shaw, Tony Kinsey, and songwriter Duncan Lamont. He was active in the post-war Latin music scene, including working with the Deniz Brothers.

Holder was represented during the 1950s by theatre impresario Bernard Delfont and Harold Davison. In the middle of the decade, he was approached by British jazz record producer Denis Preston to record calypso music. Holder's records at the ime were issued by Pye. In the late 1950s, Kenny Graham and His Orchestra recorded with Holder for Decca. Other recordings from this period include sessions for Cab Kaye and a film soundtrack single release called "Nor the Moon by Night" with conductor and arranger Ron Goodwin for Parlophone. Goodwin was working closely with producer George Martin, who was also involved with Parlophone. In 1959, Holder contributed percussion to the Joe Harriott album Southern Horizons (1960). Holder worked with drummer Phil Seamen. In the mid-1960s, Holder recorded with Ethiopian musician Mulatu Astatke.

=== Later years ===
Holder branched out into variety and cabaret performances, appearing in many countries and at London venues such as the London Palladium, Lyceum, and Paramount. He often gave his time to charity fund raising events. Later bills were shared with Bill Haley and his Comets, Guy Mitchell, and Johnnie Ray. In 1963, Holder appeared at the National Jazz and Blues Festival at Richmond. In 1964, he was compère for the BBC One series Carnival, working with Ginger Johnson, Carmen Munroe, and Geoff Love with his Orchestra. That year, he also performed for Peter Sellers and Britt Ekland for their wedding party at the Tiberio Restaurant Mayfair. In 1966, Holder appeared with the BBC Radio Orchestra and in the following year recorded with John Dankworth, featuring the actress singer Nadia Cattouse. In 1972, Holder was one of the winners of the Castlebar Song Contest for the folk ballad "Song for Jenny", composed by Sheila Roberts.

In 1974, Holder was invited to sing with the Scottish Symphony Orchestra at a Royal Albert Hall Promenade Concert with soprano Margaret Gale and the BBC Chorus. In 1990 he appeared with the BBC Big Band at Fairfield Halls, Croydon. The following year, he played congas and bongos on an album by Barbara Thompson's band Paraphernalia entitled Breathless.

In 1996, he performed as a guest on guitarist Eduardo Niebla's album I Can Fly Now, playing both congas and bongos. He was a member of the Latin jazz band Paz and was featured on the band's album Samba Samba (1997) with drummer Chris Dagley. In 2003, he was a guest on the album Cleo Laine and Laurie Holloway, Loesser Genius, with John Dankworth. Performances followed with Steve Waterman's album Our Delight: A Jazz Odyssey in 2006. Holder also worked with Mornington Lockett and Dave O'Higgins. O'Higgins appeared on Holder's album Ballads Blues at Bop. Pete Long featured Holder in his Gillespiana Be-Bop Orchestra, a band that paid tribute to the music of Dizzy Gillespie. In 2010, Holder featured on a double bill at Ronnie Scott's with vocalist Juliet Kelly. He worked with arranger Nick Ingman and the Fraser-Myers Big Band and for Carlin Music for Paul Williams. In 2011, Holder performed at the gala jazz event A Tribute to John Dankworth and the Big Band at the Queen Elizabeth Hall.

In 2012, Holder teamed up with guitarist Shane Hill to record his final album, Interpretations, featuring Peter King on alto, Dick Pearce on Flugel, Val Manix bass and Noel Joyce kit. Well received by the jazz media, it brought Holder back into the limelight. Later that year, he was interviewed by Clemency Burton Hill, and as a result of this interview, appeared in a BBC Two Culture Show documentary called Swinging into the Blitz, a programme exploring the history of black music in the UK, beginning in the 1930s. Burton Hill cited Holder as a connection to the early swing musicians such as Ken Snakehips Johnson and Leslie" Jiver" Hutchinson. The documentary was commissioned by the BBC to contextualise the black music scene explored in the Stephen Poliakoff television drama Dancing on the Edge which portrayed a fictional successful black band leader called Louis Lester.

Holder appeared with Pat Smythe, Tony Lee, John Critchinson, David Newton, Neville Dickie, Jonathan Gee, Malcolm Edmonstone, Michael Garrick and Geoff Castle.

In 2012, Holder performed with pianist Derek Paravicini in a show dedicated to the music of George Shearing. Former Blue Mink member and Watermill Jazz Club founder Ann Odell was music director and arranger for the show. Lady Shearing endorsed the show. Other guitarists Holder appeared or recorded with include Acoustic Alchemy founder member Simon James, Adam Salkeld and Jim Mullen.

Until the age of 92, Holder was still performing around London. In 2013, Holder was featured in the annual vocal summit of the London Jazz Festival with Joe Stilgoe and Theo Jackson. The event represented three generations of UK based jazz singers. Holder also shared his approach to singing and voice preservation in an article for The Voice Council magazine, published in April 2014. Holder often performed at The Stables in Wavendon with the Dankworth family for their Christmas music parties, working with Mark Nightingale and trumpeter Guy Barker. His band often included Stan Robinson on tenor saxophone.

== Personal life and death ==
A keen sportsman, Holder played cricket with Gary Sobers and Wes Hall for charity events. As a young man he was a boxer and sprinter. He was a cousin of actor Ram John Holder. Holder died in Carshalton, London, on 29 October 2017.

== Awards and honors ==
- No. 6 in the Melody Maker Readers' Poll for best male vocalist and No. 11 in a separate chart for his bongo playing, 1957
- Freedom of the City of London, 1994
- Top Ten album, Ballads Blues at Bop, Jazz Journal, 2009
- Worshipful Company of Musicians Lifetime Achievement Medal, 2015

== Discography ==
- Frank Holder Sings Calypso with the Kenny Graham Orchestra (Decca, 1957)
- Calypso Time with Frank Holder (Pye, 1957)
- Frank Holder Sings Calypso Cavalcade (London Records / Richmond, 1958)
- Nor the Moon by Night featuring Frank Holder (Parlophone, 1958)
- Loesser Genius, Laurie Holloway & Cleo Laine
- Samba Samba Paz featuring Frank Holder (Saxology, 1997)
- Carousel (Mainstem, 2002)
- The Artistry of Frank Holder (Mainstem, 2005)
- Born to Swing, Frank Holder with the Geoff Castle Trio (2005)
- I Love Being Here with You (Mainstem, 2006)
- Boss Frank Holder and the Fraser-Myers Big Band (2007)
- Ballads, Blues and Bop (Mainstem, 2009)
- Interpretations, Frank Holder, Shane Hill (2012)
