= Stan Robinson =

English jazz musician (1936–2017)

Background information
- Born: 13 April 1936; Salford, Lancashire, England
- Died: 9 April 2017 (aged 80)
- Genres: Jazz
- Occupation: Musician
- Instrument(s): Saxophone, flute

Stan Robinson (13 April 1936 – 9 April 2017) was an English jazz tenor saxophonist and flautist.

Robinson started playing professionally at Manchester's Club 43 before travelling to London and appearing at Ronnie Scott's Club in the early 1960s, often in a quartet featuring the young drummer Peter "Ginger" Baker. In an article in Jazz News magazine in September 1960, Tubby Hayes was cited as saying that he believed Robinson to be among the most promising new British tenor saxophonists to have emerged during the late 1950s. Robinson would work with Hayes in several different line-ups and was present on the final public appearance of Hayes's big band at Ronnie Scott's club in February 1973.

During 1960–61, Robinson was a member of the third incarnation of the Jazzmakers, co-led by drummer Allan Ganley and trombonist Keith Christie which also included pianist Colin Purbrook and bassist Arthur Watts. This group recorded an as yet unissued album at IBC Studios in London in December 1960, which had it been released would have marked Robinson's debut recording.

During the 1960s he played with various prominent UK jazz groups including the Phil Seamen Quintet, The Downbeat Big Band, Tubby Hayes’ Big Band, the Johnny Burch Octet, Long John Baldry, Sandy Brown's band (also featuring Al Fairweather, Malcolm Cecil and Brian Lemon), Humphrey Lyttelton (in both a big band and small group setting), The Kenny Clarke-Francy Boland Big Band and the BBC Radio Orchestra.

Together with fellow tenors Dick Morrissey and Al Gay, baritone sax Paul Carroll, and trumpets Ian Carr, Kenny Wheeler and Greg Bowen, he formed part of (Eric Burdon and) The Animals's Big Band that made its one-and-only public appearance at the 5th Annual British Jazz & Blues Festival in Richmond (1965).

In the early 1970s, he was a member of the Don Rendell Quintet, with drummer Trevor Tomkins and multi-instrumentalist Peter Shade, appearing on Rendell's albums Change Is (1969) and Space Walk (1972). He remained associated with Rendell intermittently until the 2000s. During 1970-1973 Robinson was a member of trumpeter Maynard Ferguson's big band, then based in the United Kingdom and comprising British musicians. Robinson can be heard on the albums MF Horn 2 and Alive and Well in London, an album on which he and Alan Skidmore share the (uncredited) saxophone solos. During the late 2000s, former Ferguson manager and sideman Ernie Garside authorised the release of two volumes of previously unissued Ferguson recordings dating from the 1970s, on which Robinson is also prominently featured, although sadly his contributions are often misattributed to other players.

Widely recognised for his full-toned delivery, agile technique and harmonic detail, Robinson's style during the 1960s and 1970s reflected the influence of several leading American jazzmen, including Sonny Rollins and Joe Henderson, whose work he closely echoes on the album Space Walk. He also made effective use of the flute, clarinet, alto and soprano saxes. Robinson was also regarded as an authority on saxophone mouthpieces, in particular in adapting and altering their internal dimensions to suit a particular player's style and requirements.

The US stars he toured with include King Curtis, Aretha Franklin, Dizzy Gillespie, Andy Williams and Tony Bennett. In 1987, he toured the United States with Rolling Stones drummer Charlie Watts’ Orchestra, in a saxophone section also including fellow tenorists Alan Skidmore, Danny Moss, Bobby Wellins, Don Weller and Evan Parker. Robinson has also led his own quartets, sometimes including long-term colleague, pianist Brian Dee.

During the 2000s he continued to co-lead a trio with ex-Nucleus keyboardist Geoff Castle, often working with veteran vocalist Frank Holder.

== Selected discography ==
- The Allan Ganley-Keith Christie Jazzmakers (Unissued) – 1960
- Change Is – Don Rendell/Ian Carr Quintet (Columbia/Lansdowne reissued by Vocalion) – 1969
- Greek Variations – Neil Ardley (Columbia/Lansdowne reissued by Universal) – 1969
- Space Walk – Don Rendell Quintet (Columbia/Lansdowne reissued by ReDial) – 1972
- Maynard Ferguson – Alive and Well In London (CBS reissued by BGO) – 1971
- Maynard Ferguson – MF Horn 2 (CBS reissued by BGO) – 1972
- Maynard Ferguson – The Lost Tapes: Volume One (Sleepy Night Records) – 2007
- Maynard Ferguson – The Lost Tapes: Volume Two (Sleepy Night Records) – 2008
- Ourselves
- Jazz in the Dungeon – 1999
