= Movement (Joe Harriott album) =

Studio album by Joe Harriott
- Released: 1963
- Recorded: 1963; London, England
- Genre: Jazz
- Labels: Columbia (UK); 33SX 1627
- Producer: Denis Preston

Joe Harriott chronology
Abstract (1963)	Movement (1963)	High Spirits (1964)

Movement is an album by the Jamaican saxophonist Joe Harriott recorded in England in 1963 and released on the Columbia (UK) label.

== Reception ==
All About Jazz writer, Duncan Heining, stated "Movement is perhaps the best representation of a typical Joe Harriott Quintet gig of the period, combining as it does straight-ahead tracks with his free-form work".

== Track listing ==
All compositions by Joe Harriott except as indicated

1. "Morning Blue" - 4:43
2. "Beams" - 5:15
3. "Count Twelve" - 3:29
4. "Face in the Crowd" (Michael Garrick) - 5:14
5. "Revival" - 3:11
6. "Blues On Blues" (Garrick) - 4:53
7. "Spaces" - 6:28
8. "Spiritual Blues" - 3:40
9. "Movement "- 4:33

== Personnel ==
- Joe Harriott - alto saxophone
- Shake Keane - trumpet, flugelhorn
- Pat Smythe - piano
- Coleridge Goode - bass
- Bobby Orr - drums
