= Bobby Orr (drummer) =

Scottish jazz drummer (1928–2020)

Robert Orr (15 August 1928 – 12 March 2020) was a Scottish jazz drummer and session musician.

== Early life ==
Orr was born in Cambuslang, Scotland on 15 August 1928. His father's name was John Orr. Orr began playing drums at the age of three, encouraged by his father, a drum major. From the age of 16 Orr also played the trumpet, as a member of Basil Kirchin's band; however, he had difficulties with his embouchure and returned to the drums.

== Later life and career ==
In the 1950s and 1960s, Orr was a fixture on the London jazz scene, including as a founder member of Joe Harriott's quintet (which he left and subsequently rejoined) and for Tubby Hayes and others. He also served as a house drummer at Ronnie Scott's Club, backing top American visitors such as Zoot Sims, Al Cohn, Milt Jackson, and Dizzy Gillespie.

Orr had three tours with Benny Goodman. As a freelance from 1970, he also toured with Billy Eckstine and Sammy Davis Jr., as well as Tommy Whittle and Don Lusher. In the 1990s, Orr toured extensively with the UK Glenn Miller Tribute Band. As an aside from his jazz career, he also played on many recording sessions for pop and rock artists such as Donovan and Dusty Springfield.

== Discography ==
With Sandy Brown

- Work Song (Lake, 1962–68)
- Hair At It's Hairiest (Fontana, 1969)
- In the Evening (Lake, 1970–71)

With George Chisholm

- Clinton Ford (Oriole, 1962)
- In a Mellow Mood (Peerless, 1974)
- George Chisholm's Trombone Showcase (Line Records, 1975)
- The Swingin' Mr. C. (Zodiac Records, 1986)

With Tony Coe and Robert Farnon

- Pop Makes Progress (Chapter One, 1970)

With Digby Fairweather

- Songs for Sandy (Hep, 1970–82)

With Benny Goodman

- Benny Goodman Today (London records, 1970)

With Joe Harriott

- Blue Harriott (Columbia UK, 1959)
- A Guy Called Joe (Columbia UK, 1960)
- Southern Horizons (Jazzland, 1960)
- Abstract (Capitol, 1962)
- Movement (Columbia, 1963)
- High Spirits (Columbia, 1964)

With Shake Keane

- Bossa Negra (Columbia, 1962)
- That's the Noise (Decca, 1965)

Main source:
