= Mike McKenzie (jazz musician) =

Guyanese musician (1922–1999)

Oscar Grenville Hastings McKenzie (17 September 1922, British Guiana – December 1999, Spain), known as Mike McKenzie, was a Guyanese jazz pianist, bandleader, vocalist, composer and arranger, who performed in London from the 1950s to the 1980s. He covered a wide repertoire, from Habanera and Calypso, to trad jazz, swing and jazz standards. He led The Mike McKenzie Trio, Quartet and Quintet; Mike McKenzie's Habaneros; Mike McKenzie and his Rhythm; and The Mike McKenzie All Stars.

== Early years ==
McKenzie was taught piano by his mother from the age of seven, and violin by his father from the age of 16. He played regularly in Georgetown, then moved to London in 1949.

== 1950s and 1960s ==
At the beginning of the 1950s, McKenzie was working with producer Denis Preston at both the BBC and for the Melodisc and Parlophone record labels. Preston rapidly established McKenzie as a regular recording artist and contributor to radio and television broadcasts for at least a decade. Preston had an ear for putting together musicians from different genres and had a production company that licensed his recordings to commercial record labels:

The year 1952 also saw a series of experimental recordings produced by Denis Preston for Parlophone that combined British disciples of New Orleans Creole Jazz, led by trumpeter Humphrey Lyttelton, with a West Indian rhythm section, led by Freddy Grant. These recordings, by the Grant-Lyttelton Paseo Jazz Band favoured a North American repertoire. There were two exceptions, however Fat Tuesday — another name for Mardi Gras in New Orleans — was based on a tune "dug up from the recesses of [Freddy Grant‘s] memory"; and Mike’s Tangana was written by Mike McKenzie in a way that fused black Latin American and North American styles. A touring show was organised to feature this music and its musicians. Included in the package were three West Indian singers George Browne (a Trinidadian, known initially as "Young Tiger"), the Jamaican Tony Johnson, and "the tenor who makes no error" Bill Rogers (Augustus Hinds), who was from Guyana.

McKenzie's line ups similarly featured a fusion of instrumentalists: Joe Harriott, Shake Keane, Bertie King, Humphrey Lyttleton, Denny Wright and Jack Fallon, and vocalists George Browne, Marie Bryant and Lili Verona.

McKenzie also featured in the founding of the Black British carnival tradition. On 30 January 1959, The Mike McKenzie Trio performed with Cleo Laine at the first Caribbean Carnival (West Indian Gazette Carnival) at St Pancras Town Hall, a precursor to the Notting Hill Carnival. Prior to that, in 1957, he had appeared in a BBC radio programme, Caribbean Carnival: The British West Indies Show. Every year, from 1954 to 1961, he represented the West Indies on a series of BBC Radio programmes celebrating music from the Commonwealth.

He performed, either solo or with a combo, at London venues as well as the Moss Empires circuit. They included the Colony Room Club in Soho (1950–c.1970), Hungaria Restaurant in Regent Street (1955), The Milroy and The Empress clubs in Mayfair and Le Caprice restaurant in St James's. In 1964, he appeared in a documentary filmed in a pub in the Isle of Dogs, accompanying its proprietor, Queenie Watts, performing the Sinatra classic "The Best Is Yet to Come".

McKenzie freelanced or featured as a sideman with groups such as those of Lord Kitchener, Joe Appleton (1950), Humphrey Lyttleton (with whom he toured and recorded in 1952), Fela Sowande's BBC Ebony Club Band (1953) and Lonnie Donnegan, with whom he guested. He toured with Jack Parnell in the jazz revue Jazz Wagon (c.1954), accompanied Ella Fitzgerald at the Mars Bar in Paris and played at the London Palladium with the Ted Heath Orchestra.

His broadcast career with the BBC lasted for 20 years; he was a familiar name in broadcasting, with frequent appearances on the BBC Light Programme, playing a huge range of styles.

He composed songs with his wife, the lyricist and actress Elizabeth McKenzie, and Denis Preston; he was an arranger for Humphrey Lyttleton and Wally Fawkes.

== 1970s and 1980s ==
On 28 November 1972, McKenzie started a four-year residency at The White Elephant on the River in Chelsea, accompanied by Johnny Hawksworth and Stuart Livingston, followed by seven years at The Dorchester, and finally in the 1980s, nine years at The Savoy, eventually playing from his wheelchair. In 1978, he returned to working with the producer Denis Preston on a recording which was never released since Preston died in 1979 before it could be issued. According to its composer Daryl Runswick, McKenzie was by then firmly established as a nightclub pianist, and "had a residency at a nightclub in Mayfair – Berkeley Square, if I remember correctly. This was to be Mike's record, to be sold on the door at the nightclub as the punters left [...] In a further twist, Denis prescribed that the musical style was to be Latin Fusion in the manner of Carlos Santana. What this had to do with Mike McKenzie and his cocktail jazz I never worked out."

In 1984, McKenzie recorded an LP of his songs with Elizabeth McKenzie, Spell It Out, which he co-produced with his son, the bass player John McKenzie.

== Legacy ==
Vibert C. Cambridge, in his book Musical Life in Guyana, describes the contributions West Indian musicians made to the evolution of British popular music during the 20th century, singling out calypso recordings in particular:

By the 1950s musicians from British Guiana such as Robert Adams, Freddy Grant, Rannie Hart, Cy Grant, Frank Holder, Mike McKenzie and Iggy Quail were among the key contributors to this evolution. Freddy Grant and Rannie Hart were noted for their versatility on the woodwind instruments. Freddy Grant played clarinet and flute; Rannie "Sweet Lips" Hart was a trumpet virtuoso. Both men were also bandleaders: Freddy Grant led the Demerarians and Rannie Hart the Caribbean Boys. Mike McKenzie and Iggy Quail were innovative pianists and members of the bands led by Grant and Hart. Grant, Hart, McKenzie, Holder and Quail influenced the direction of jazz in the UK through their interactions with British-born performers such as Humphrey Lyttleton and Johnny Dankworth. These men along with Cy Grant also contributed to the popularization of calypso music. Freddy Grant and Rannie Hart were featured on most of the seminal calypso recordings made in the United Kingdom during the 1950s. They accompanied the calypso icon Lord Kitchener on a majority of his recordings for the Parlophone label. This group also accompanied Bill Rogers in 1952, when he visited the United Kingdom to record with the Melodisc and Parlophone labels. Bill Rogers' 1952 recordings features Freddy Grant on clarinet, flute, and maracas; Rannie Hart on trumpet and cigar box; Mike McKenzie on piano; Lawrence Weeks from India on bongos; and Joe Sampson on string bass. Eight 78-rpm records resulted from the sessions. These included remakes of British Guiana Bargee, Weed Woman, and Daddy Gone to Cove and John [and] Nice Woman, Ugly Man, Bald-Plated Emily, Necromancy, Sightseeing in the UK, and The Hungry Man from Clapham [...] a "shantoized" version of a popular British music hall song..."

== In popular culture ==
The lyrics of "Tomato" (1952) and "Little Boy" (1953) are quoted in Frank Norman's 1959 novel, Stand on Me.

== Media appearances ==
=== 1953–66 TV and film appearances as self ===
- 6 June 1953: Commonwealth Cavalcade: A programme specially devised for Coronation week, with leading artists from the British Commonwealth of Nations, BBC.
- 4 May 1954: Jazz Session, The Humphrey Lyttleton All-Stars, introduced by Denis Preston from the Ballroom at Streatham Ice Rink, BBC.
- 25 January 1955: Is Jazz Music?: A programme about one of the controversial aspects of modern entertainment. Berkeley Smith asks the questions and Denis Preston provides the answers", feat. Mike McKenzie, from the Ballroom of the Streatham Ice Rink, London, BBC
- 3 March 1957: The Jack Jackson Show, ATV.
- 1964: Portrait of Queenie, Eyeline Films. Documentary of singer & publican Queenie Watts, shot at The Iron Bridge Tavern, East End.
- 10 July 1964: Carnival, feat. Danny Williams, The Clark Brothers, Joy Marshall, The Chariots, Isabelle Lucas, Beverley Mills and Boysie Grant, Mike McKenzie, Shake Keane, The Stretch Cox Limbo Group with Geoffrey Biddeau. Introductions by Frank Holder. From the North, BBC One.
- 11 May 1966: Viewpoint: The Happening: A new folk opera in rehearsal Annette Battams works with a group of fellow artists: Among those appearing with her are Mike McKenzie.

=== 1962–88 TV casting ===
- 1 January; 22 July 1962: Maigret: The Reluctant Witness, as pianist, BBC.
- 5 June 1962: Dark Pilgrimage, First performance of a new opera specially commissioned for BBC Television. The action takes place in a fairground, an opera house, and Pluto's night-club. London Symphony Orchestra. [Nightclub scene feat. Yorke de Souza, Mike McKenzie, Shake Keane, Joe Harriott, Coleridge Goode, Thomas Jones], BBC.
- 1975: Upstairs, Downstairs Series 5, Episode 6: An Old Flame, as "The Pianist" (in an unlicensed club possibly named "The Hot Club in Gerard Street", raided by the police). LWT.
- 1 April 1988: Raspberry Ripple, as pianist, BBC One

=== 1966 TV musical director ===
- 3 April 1966: Meeting Point: Negro Theatre Workshop presents The Dark Disciples: a Blues version of the Passion, BBC One.

=== 1951–65 BBC Light Programme ===
- 6 October 1951: Jazz Club: Creole Music from New Orleans and Points South, presented by Freddy Grant's Caribbean Rhythm with The Lion, Mike McKenzie and Lord Kitchener, introduced by Denis Preston.
- 22 December 1951: Jazz Club: Masters of Jazz: Composers whose works have become a permanent part of the jazz repertoire, the music of W. C. Handy played by the Jazz Club Blusicians featuring Humphrey Lyttelton, Mike McKenzie and George Brown, introduced by Denis Preston.
- 19 July 1952: Jazz Club Magazine, with Marie Bryant and Mike McKenzie.
- 11 September 1952: Piano Playtime, Mike McKenzie at the piano.
- 27 December 1952: World of Jazz, ed. Denis Preston - Christmas Party Guests include: Kenny Baker, George Chisholm, Johnny Dankworth, Jack Fallon, Wally Fawkes, Don Fraser, Stéphane Grappelli, Humphrey Lyttelton, Mike McKenzie, Jack Parnell, Ralph Sharon; Host, Charles Chilton.
- 8 January 1953: Piano Playtime, Mike McKenzie at the piano.
- 10 January 1953: World of Jazz, ed. Denis Preston - Mike McKenzie: The Spanish Tinge.
- 30 June; 31 August 1953: Piano Playtime, Mike McKenzie at the piano.
- 6 January 1954: Piano Playtime, Mike McKenzie at the piano.
- 7 January 1954: The White Cockatoo: A nightclub at your fireside feat. Cabaret by Mike McKenzie.
- 13 April 1954: BBC Swing Session feat. On the Beat with Mike McKenzie, introduced by Ted Heath.
- 15 July 1954: How Do You Do?: A Friendly get together of Commonwealth artists, feat. Mike McKenzie (West Indies).
- 17 July 1954: Piano Playtime, Mike McKenzie at the piano.
- 14 October 1954: How Do You Do?: A Friendly get together of Commonwealth artists, feat. Mike McKenzie (West Indies).
- 15 April; 9 July; 2 September 1955: Piano Playtime, Mike McKenzie at the piano, BBC Light Programme.
- 7/14 July; 8 September 1955: Tempo Tropicale: Dance music from Latin America and the Caribbean, feat. Mike McKenzie.
- 1/8/15 November 1955: Commonwealth of Song: Artists from the Commonwealth of Nations gather in London to send greetings in song to their folks at home and to listeners in the Motherland, feat. Mike McKenzie (West Indies) and the Johnston Singers (United Kingdom).
- 1 February 1956: How Do You Do?: Carroll Levis introduces an informal get-together of Commonwealth artists, feat. Mike McKenzie and his Rhythm.
- 19 June; 16/22 September 1956: Piano Playtime, Mike McKenzie at the piano.
- 9/16 September; 30 December 1956: Commonwealth of Song: Artists from the Commonwealth of Nations gather in London to send greetings in song to their folks at home and to listeners in the Motherland, feat. Mike McKenzie (West Indies).
- 15 February; 27 July 1957: Piano Playtime, Mike McKenzie at the piano.
- 17 February 1957 Commonwealth of Song, feat. Mike McKenzie (West Indies).
- 18 August; 1 September 1957: Caribbean Carnival: The British West Indies Show, feat. Mike McKenzie.
- 29 August 1957; 5/12/19/26 September: Paul Fenoulhet introduces Moonlight Serenade: Music with a restful rhythm, feat. Mike McKenzie.
- 6/13 November 1958: Mike McKenzie in Piano Reflections.
- 22 November 1958: Saturday Club: The best of today's "pop" entertainment, feat. The Mike McKenzie Quartet.
- 1/8 January 1959: Mike McKenzie in Piano Reflections.
- 2 January; 6 March 1959 Commonwealth of Song, feat. Mike McKenzie (West Indies).
- 24 January; 11 April; 4 July; 5 September 1959: Saturday Club: The best of today's 'pop' entertainment, feat. The Mike McKenzie Quartet.
- 23 August 1959: Without a Song: An orchestral programme in the style of Geraldo and his Concert Orchestra with Mike McKenzie at the piano.
- 23/30 August; 16 October; 13 November 1959: Kings of the Keyboard: Piano music in contrasting style, feat. Mike McKenzie (Latin-American music).
- 11/18/25 September 1959: Swingalong, with Mike McKenzie and the BBC West of England Light Orchestra.
- 19 December 1959: Mike McKenzie: at the piano.
- 16 January; 21 May 1960: Saturday Club: The best of today's 'pop' entertainment, feat. The Mike McKenzie Quartet.
- 5 March 1960: Saturday Club: The best of today's 'pop' entertainment, feat. The Mike McKenzie Quartet with Scott Peters.
- 9/16/30 June; 7/14/21/28 July; 4/11/25 August; 18 August; 1 September 1960: Piano in the Parlour, feat. Bill McGuffie, David Lee and Mike McKenzie in an informal keyboard get-together.
- 30 October 1960: Commonwealth of Song: Artists from the Commonwealth gather in London to send greetings in song to their friends and relations at home and to listeners in Britain , feat. Mike McKenzie (British Guiana).
- 24 July; 16 October 1961: Commonwealth of Song: artists from the Commonwealth who are gathered in London to send musical greetings to their friends and relations at home and to listeners in Britain, feat. Mike McKenzie (West Indies).
- 16 August; 6/27 September 1961: Sweet Corn: Music for Modern Squares, feat. The Mike McKenzie Quartet.
- 4 March 1961: Saturday Club: The best of today's 'pop' entertainment, feat. The Mike McKenzie Quartet with Scott Peters.
- 26 August 1961: Piano Interlude, with Mike McKenzie.
- 1/22 October 1963: Music to Midnight, feat. The Mike McKenzie Trio.
- 16 March 1963: Piano Interlude, with Mike McKenzie.
- 19 January 1965: Carnival, with Cleo Laine, Scott Peters, The Mike McKenzie Trio and The Carnival Orchestra, introduced by Humphrey Lyttleton.
- 18 December 1965: The Mike McKenzie Trio, introduced by Roger Moffatt.

=== 1953–59 BBC Home Service ===
- 3/10/17/24/31 March 1953: First House Club Ebony (guest), introduced by George Browne and Earl Cameron.
- 24 February; 7/14 April 1953: First House Club Ebony (guest), introduced by George Browne.
- 1 April 1955: Midday Music-Hall, feat. A Note or Two from Mike McKenzie.
- 3/31 August 1956: Mike McKenzie: At the piano.
- 31 October; 5/12 December 1958: Kings of the Keyboard: Piano music in contrasting styles, feat. Mike McKenzie (Latin-American music).
- 6 February; 20 March 1959: Kings of the Keyboard: Piano music in contrasting styles, feat. Mike McKenzie (Latin-American music).

=== 1971 BBC Radio 2 ===
- 7 June 1971: "Concert Grand: piano music in contrasting styles", feat. The Mike McKenzie Trio.

== Recordings ==
=== 1951 with Melodisc Records ===
- 1188 "Al Momento" /The Peanut Vendor (Moisés Simons) {1951} – Mike McKenzie's Habaneros
- 1207 "Mama Inez" (Eliseo Grenet, L. Wolfe Gilbert)/ Maria, My Own (Gilbert Lecuona) {1951} – Mike McKenzie's Habaneros
- 1224 Without You / Cuban Love Song {1951} – Tony Johnson, Mike McKenzie's Habaneros
- 1230 Nice Woman, Ugly Man / BG Bargee - Shanto {1951} – Bill Rogers, Freddie Grant's Demerarians feat Rannie Hart, tpt, and Mike McKenzie, pno

=== 1951–54 privately recorded ===
[incl. in "Humphrey Lyttelton: The Other Parlophones 1951–1954" (2006)]

- Ain't Misbehavin' / Beale Street Blues / Georgia on My Mind / Wrap Your Troubles in Dreams {November 6, 1951 - December 2, 1954} – feat: Marie Bryant, Mike McKenzie Quartet (Mike McKenzie pno, Humphrey Lyttleton tpt, Denny Wright gtr, Jack Fallon bass)

=== 1952–54 with Lyragon (Polygon Records) ===
- J 701 Tomato / Rhumboogie Anna (Rene) {November 1952} – Marie Bryant acc. Mike McKenzie Quintet feat. Bertie King – alto sax
- J 707 War In The East (A. Roberts) / Coronation Calypso {Feb 1953} – Lord Kitchener (with St Vincent Street Six (feat. Fitzroy Coleman, guitar & Mike McKenzie, piano))
- J 708 Jazz Me Blues / Jazz Jubilee (McKenzie) {Apr 1953} – Mike McKenzie piano, with guitar & bass
- J 709 Little Boy - Calypso (Henderson) {April 1953} – Marie Bryant acc. Mike McKenzie Quintet feat. Sam Walker - tenor sax
- J 713 Mike's Tangena / How High The Moon {July 1953} – Mike McKenzie
- J 714 I Cried For You (Freed) / The Piccolino (Irving Berlin) {Jul 1953} – Bruce Turner, alt sax; Mike McKenzie, pno; Joe Sampson, bass; Leslie Weeks, drums; Fitzroy Coleman, gtr; Denis Evelyn, vibes; Sam Walker; ten sax
- J 724 The Lost Watch (Tick Tick) (R. de Leon) {January 1954} – Marie Bryant acc. Mike McKenzie Quintet

=== 1953–54 with His Master's Voice ===
- B 10527 You Won't Be Satisfied (James, Stock)/ Queen Of Tonga (Jack Fishman) {1953} – John Paris with Mike McKenzie, the Harlem All-Stars and the Ebonaires
- G.V. 202 Massa Johnnie (trad., arr. Samuel) / Hog Eena Mi Cocoa (trad., arr. Samuel) [OEF243-2A] 7MC 13 {15-02-1954 London, Britain} / [OEF244-1A] 7MC 13 {15-02-1954 London, Britain} – Lili Verona with Mike McKenzie’s All Stars
- G.V. 204 Shake's Highlife (McKenzie) / Mambo Indio (Daniron) [OEF 245-1A] {17-02-1954 London, Britain} / [OEF 246-2A] {17-02-1954 London, Britain} – Shake Keane and his Trumpet with Mike McKenzie’s All Stars
- G.V. 207 Akinla (trad. collected by Mike McKenzie) / Fire, Fire (trad. collected by Mike McKenzie) [OEF259-1A] {15-04-1954 London, Britain} / [OEF260-1A] {15-04-1954 London, Britain} – Shake Keane and his Trumpet with Mike McKenzie’s All Stars

=== 1956–57 with Parlophone ===
- M.P. 126 Calypso Mambo (George Browne) – George Browne With Mike McKenzie's All Stars
- GEP8594 Calypso Time: "When woman say no she means yes" / "A little more oil in your lamp "(and the Ebonaires) / "Somebody bad stole de wedding bell (Who's got de ding dong?)" / "Woman is a man's best friend" {1956} – George Browne with Mike McKenzie's All Stars
- GEP 8620 Calypso Time No. 2: "The Peanut Vendor" / "Matilda, Matilda" {1957} – George Browne with Mike McKenzie's All Stars

=== 1957 with Pye Nixa ===
- Mike's Moods: "Manhattan" (Richard Rodgers, Lorenz Hart) / "You Better Go Now" (Irvin Graham, Bix Reichner, from New Faces Of 1936) / "Give Me The Simple Life" (Harry Ruby, Rube Bloom) / "Maybe I Should Change My Ways" (Duke Ellington) {1957} – Mike McKenzie Trio

=== 1960 with Columbia ===
- SEGC 4 Meditating with Mike McKenzie: Mike McKenzie plays and sings Hoagy Carmichael: Side One: "Judy" (pno and vcl)/ "Georgia on my Mind" pno solo {unknown date}
- SEDQ 613 Mike McKenzie: "Cemile: Tango" (Papadoupolos)/ "Elmina: Tepo" (Papadoupolos)/ "Siboney" (Lecuona)/ "Occhi Verdi" (Menendez) {1960} – pianoforte con accompagnamento Ritmi

=== 1974 with Decca ===
Music for Martini People, Mike McKenzie, Double Album, Decca, 1974
No.	Title	Length
1.	"Manhattan" (Rodgers, Hart)
2.	"A Lovely Way to Spend an Evening" (McHugh, Adamson)
3.	"Cocktails for Two" (Johnston, Coslow)
4.	"Red Sails in the Sunset" (Kennedy, Williams)
5.	"Venice Blue" (Aznavour, Lees, Dorin)
6.	"–And The Martini Theme" (Gunning)
7.	"The Most Beautiful Girl In The World" (Rodgers, Hart)
8.	"It Had To Be You" (Kahn, Jones)
9.	"How Soon" (Mancini, Stillman)
10.	"Days of Wine and Roses" (Mancini, Mercer)
11.	"Make It Another Old-Fashioned, Please" (Cole Porter)
12.	"My One and Only Love" (Mellin, Wood)
13.	"–And The Martini Theme" (Gunning)
14.	"Down In The Depths" (Cole Porter)
15.	"Strange Love" (M. & E. McKenzie)
16.	"Skylark" (Carmichael, Mercer)
17.	"Out Of Nowhere (You Came Along From)" (Heyman, Green)
18.	"Just One More Chance" (Coslow, Johnston)
19.	"Why Do You Pass Me By" (Curt, Trenet, Hess, Misraki)
20.	"–And The Martini Theme" (Gunning)
21.	"Solitude" (De Lange, Mills, Ellington)
22.	"If I Had You" (Shapiro, Campbell, Connelly)
23.	"As Time Goes By" (Hupfeld)
24.	"Satin Doll" (Ellington, Mercer, Strayhorn)
25.	"I'm Thru' With Love" (Malneck, Livingston, Kahn)
26.	"–And The Martini Theme" (Gunning)

=== 1978 unreleased ===
- "El Plantano": Canto (Daryl Runswick)/ Dee Dee (Daryl Runswick)/ One for Denis (Daryl Runswick) {1978} – produced by Denis Preston, recorded at Lansdowne Studio A; Norma Winstone, vce; Tony Coe, reeds; Henry Lowther, tpt, flugelhrn; Phil Lee, lead gtr; Dick Abel, rhythm gtr; Alan Branscombe, keyboards, perc; Daryl Runswick, mus dir, bss gtr, string synth, elc pno, dble bss, vce; Harold Fisher, drums; Chris Karan, drums, perc; Tony Carr, drums, perc; Mike McKenzie, pno solo, vce; Don Harper, vln/vla

=== 1984 with Lizilu ===
- LU001 "Spell It Out": Side One: Sweet Music (McKenzie)/ I Believe in Love (McKenzie)/ Can I Buy You A Dream (McKenzie/Alec Hyams)/ Love Me Now (McKenzie)/ Something Else (McKenzie) {1984} – Lizzie & Mike McKenzie; produced by Mike and John McKenzie; Lizilu/ Mellow McKenzie Songs

== Compositions and arrangements ==
- Can I Buy You A Dream, Mike McKenzie, Alec Hyams
- Closing Time, Wally Fawkes, arr. Mike McKenzie (in 6 piano transcriptions from the Humphrey Lyttleton & Paseo Jazz Band Library, arr. Mike McKenzie)
- Hop Frog, Humphrey Lyttleton, arr. Mike McKenzie
- I Believe in Love, Mike McKenzie
- Jazz Jubilee, Mike McKenzie
- Love Me Now, Mike McKenzie
- Mama Creole, Mike McKenzie, Elizabeth McKenzie
- Mike's Tangana, Mike McKenzie, Denis Preston
- Shake's Highlife, Mike McKenzie
- Small Hour Fantasy, Humphrey Lyttleton, arr. Mike McKenzie (in 6 piano transcriptions from the Humphrey Lyttleton & Paseo Jazz Band Library, arr. Mike McKenzie)
- Something Else, Mike McKenzie
- Strange Love, Mike McKenzie, Elizabeth McKenzie
- Sweet Music, Mike McKenzie
