= Abstract (album) =

Studio album by Joe Harriott
- Released: February 1963
- Recorded: November 22, 1961, and May 10, 1962; London, England
- Genre: Jazz
- Length: 45:16
- Labels: Columbia; 33SX 1477
- Producer: Denis Preston

Joe Harriott chronology
Free Form (1960)	Abstract (1963)	Movement (1963)

Abstract is an album by the Jamaican saxophonist Joe Harriott, recorded in England in November 1961 and May 1962, and released on the Columbia (UK) label in February 1963. It was released by Capitol Records in the United States.

== Reception ==
Professional ratings
Review scores
Source	Rating
Down Beat	5/5 stars
Allmusic	4/5 stars
The Penguin Guide to Jazz Recordings	4/4 stars

Abstract was the first album by a British jazz group to be awarded five stars in a Down Beat review.

Allmusic awarded the album 4 stars and in its review by Thom Jurek, he states "Abstract is wonderful; it shows that the Brits were taking the new jazz of the early '60s and placing a spin on it because they had a few players like Joe Harriott. Here is a musician deserving of a wide reappraisal. Let's hope he gets it".

== Track listing ==
All compositions by Joe Harriott except "Subject", by Joe Harriott and John Mayer; "Oleo," by Sonny Rollins.

1. "Subject" - 5:58
2. "Shadows" - 5:44
3. "Oleo" - 7:06
4. "Modal" - 4:44
5. "Tonal" - 5:08
6. "Pictures" - 5:06
7. "Idioms" - 6:26
8. "Compound" - 5:04
- Recorded in London, England on November 22, 1961 (tracks 5–8) and May 10, 1962 (tracks 1–4)

== Personnel ==
- Joe Harriott - alto saxophone
- Shake Keane - trumpet
- Pat Smythe - piano
- Coleridge Goode - bass
- Bobby Orr (tracks 1–4), Phil Seamen (tracks 5–8) - drums
- Frank Holder - bongos (tracks 5 & 8)
