= High Spirits (album) =

Studio album by Joe Harriott
- Released: 1965
- Recorded: September 7th, 1964; Lansdowne Studios, London, England
- Genre: Jazz
- Label: Columbia; 33SX 1692
- Producer: Denis Preston

Joe Harriott chronology
Movement (1963)	High Spirits (1965)	Indo Jazz Suite (1965)

Professional ratings
Review scores
Source	Rating
Record Mirror	3/5 stars

High Spirits is an album by Jamaican saxophonist Joe Harriott featuring selections from the musical High Spirits written by Hugh Martin and Timothy Gray which was recorded in England in 1964 and released on the Columbia (UK) label in February 1965.

== Context ==
Harriott recorded eight numbers arranged by Pat Smythe from the popular stage musical "as if rejecting the experimentation of his previous LPs", says Richard Morton Jack. Harriott stated on the LP cover that the intention was to be 'easy on the ear'. Criticism that the material is not worthy of the musicians is beside the point, says Jack: "They wanted to prove their versatility". However, it didn't result in any better sales than previous LPs, and the Quintet disbanded soon after it was released.

== Reception ==
All About Jazz writer, Duncan Heining, stated: "Were it not for [his] earlier achievements, High Spirits might come more highly recommended. It is of a much lighter weight but it does have its share of pleasures. It is doubtful that Harriott could ever have made a bad record and, by most other people's standards, this would be top flight. The shortcoming of High Spirits lies in the sense that these show tunes, from the musical based on Noël Coward's play Blithe Spirit, are really fairly average West End/Broadway fare".

Morton Jack writes that the "arrangements leave plenty of space for incisive, sensitive solos from Harriott and Keane [giving it] an improvisational edge that rescues it from blandness."

== Track listing ==
All compositions by Hugh Martin and Timothy Gray arranged by Pat Smythe

1. "Home Sweet Heaven" - 3:37
2. "If I Have You" - 5:56
3. "Go Into Your Trance' - 4:18
4. "You'd Better Love Me" - 4:20
5. "I Know Your Heart" - 3:40
6. "Was She Prettier Than I" - 5:30
7. "Forever and a Day" - 5:28
8. "Something Tells Me" - 5:12

== Personnel ==
- Joe Harriott - alto saxophone
- Shake Keane - trumpet, flugelhorn
- Pat Smythe - piano
- Coleridge Goode - bass
- Bobby Orr - drums
