= Free Form (Joe Harriott album) =

Studio album by Joe Harriott
- Released: 1961
- Recorded: November 1960; London, England
- Genre: Jazz
- Length: 46:10
- Labels: Jazzland; JLP 49
- Producers: Denis Preston and Bill Grauer

Joe Harriott chronology
Southern Horizons (1960)	Free Form (1961)	Abstract (1963)

Free Form is an album by the Jamaican saxophonist Joe Harriott recorded in England in 1960, second released on the Jazzland label.

== Origins ==
Six months after the release of the more conventional Southern Horizons, Harriott experimented here with what he termed "abstract music", recorded in November 1960 at Lansdowne Studios after intense rehearsal. The producer was once again Denis Preston, with Adrian Kerridge as the recording engineer.

== Reception ==
Professional ratings
Review scores
Source	Rating
Allmusic	4/5 stars

Allmusic awarded the album 4 stars stating "Comparable to Ornette Coleman's recordings of the period, these eight pieces incorporate Harriott's hard bop influence, cutting through adventurous compositions.

== Track listing ==
All compositions by Joe Harriott

1. "Formation" - 6:13
2. "Coda" - 8:00
3. "Abstract" - 3:39
4. "Impression" - 5:32
5. "Parallel" - 5:42
6. "Straight Lines" - 5:57
7. "Calypso" - 4:44
8. "Tempo" - 6:23

== Personnel ==
- Joe Harriott - alto saxophone
- Shake Keane - trumpet
- Pat Smythe - piano
- Coleridge Goode - bass
- Phil Seamen - drums
