= Amancio D'Silva =

Indian jazz guitarist (1936–1996)

Amancio D'Silva (19 March 1936 – 17 July 1996) was an Indian jazz guitarist and composer, known for his own recordings and his collaborations with other musicians in Britain, notably Joe Harriott and Stan Tracey.

== Life ==
He was born in Bombay (now Mumbai), India, to Goan parents. He took up guitar in his teens, influenced by American jazz guitarists such as Charlie Christian and Wes Montgomery whom he heard on the radio, and soon began performing with local jazz groups. By his early 20s he had formed his own group, including saxophonist Braz Gonzalvez and pianist Anacleto Naronha, and toured around India. He met his future wife Joyce, an Irish-born teacher, in Simla. He gained such a reputation as a musician that Gayatri Devi, the Maharani of Jaipur at the time and an ardent jazz lover, became his benefactor and bought him his first quality guitar, a Gibson.

In 1967, he travelled to London with his family, primarily to seek medical treatment for his son Stephano. He and Joyce had two other children, Maria and Francesca. He worked as a cleaner, and also as a musician at the "Prospect of Whitby" pub and at the Spanish Garden Club in the West End, and began living in Ealing. Jonathan Miller introduced him to record producer Denis Preston, who set up a collaboration between D'Silva and leading British musicians Don Rendell and Ian Carr. This resulted in the EMI album Integration...introducing Amancio D’Silva, which received critical acclaim as a unique fusion of jazz and Indian music styles.

The next collaboration, in 1969, was the album Hum Dono with Jamaican-born saxophonist Joe Harriott, for which Amancio wrote the majority of the compositions, and which again met with critical support. This was followed by Reflections...the romantic guitar of Amancio D’Silva (1971), featuring orchestral arrangements by Stan Tracey of classic songs by Gershwin, Ellington and others. In 1972 he led an outfit on the album Dream Sequence, by Cosmic Eye, an avant garde group including Alan Branscombe, Kashev Sathe, and John Mayer. Other collaborations around the same time included two albums with percussionist Guy Warren, all listed below.

Amancio continued to perform, and record independently, new music with collaborators from the EMI albums and others. These included projects with Clem Alford, but also with the flautist/saxophonist Lynn Dobson amongst others. Living in Essex in the 1980s, he would play regularly at jazz clubs in Ipswich, as well as a series of concerts at St. Mary's Arts Centre in Colchester around 1985, which featured amongst others Marcio Mattos on double bass, and also concerts at Norwich Arts Centre.

As well as performing and recording extensively, Amancio also customised guitar pick-ups for well known rock musicians. He continued to perform until his health made it impossible in the mid-1990s, and also taught extensively, first at Jenako Art in London's East End from the mid-1980s to early 1990s and later at the Krishnamurti International School in Hampshire. In 1992 he was partially paralysed by a stroke. He and Joyce D'Silva remained married throughout his life. He died in 1996 following further strokes, and was buried according to his wishes at a woodland cemetery near Brighton.

== Discography ==
=== As leader/co-leader ===
- Integration...introducing Amancio D’Silva (Columbia, 1969)
- Hum Dono with Joe Harriott (Columbia, 1969)
- Reflections...the romantic guitar of Amancio D’Silva (Columbia, 1971)
- Cosmic Eye, Dream Sequence (Regal Zonophone, 1972)
- Konkan Dance (Vocalion, 2006) – rec. 1972, 1974
- Sapana (The Roundtable, 2022) – rec. 1983

=== As guest ===
With Guy Warren

- Afro Jazz (Columbia, 1968)
- The African sounds of Guy Warren of Ghana (Regal Zonophone, 1972)

With Clem Alford

- Mirror Image (Columbia, 1974)

=== On compilations ===
- Jazz Explosion: A Panorama of Contemporary British Jazz (Columbia, 1969)
- Joe Harriott Memorial 1973 (One-Up, 1973)
- Impressed with Gilles Peterson (2002)
- Impressed 2 With Gilles Peterson (2004)
- Jazz for Meditation (2007)
