= Southern Horizons =

Studio album by Joe Harriott
- Released: 1960
- Recorded: May 5, 1959 and April 8 & 21, 1960; London, England
- Genre: Jazz
- Label: Jazzland; JLP 37
- Producer: Denis Preston

Joe Harriott chronology
Southern Horizons (1960)	Free Form (1960)

Southern Horizons is an album by Jamaican saxophonist Joe Harriott recorded in England in 1959 and 1960 and released on the Jazzland label.

== Origins ==
This is Harriott's US-only debut LP, which contains (in their entirety) the mainstream EPs Blue Harriott (recorded on 5 May 1959), and A Guy Called Joe (recorded on 1 April and 21 April 1960), along with three extra tracks recorded during those sessions. The producer was Denis Preston at Lansdowne Studios, and the recording engineers were Joe Meek and Dick Lazenby. Richard Morton Jack comments that the recording "showcases his beautiful tone...but doesn't hint at the adventurous releases to come".

== Reception ==
Professional ratings
Review scores
Source	Rating
AllMusic	4/5 stars
DownBeat	2/5 stars

Leonard Feather, the contemporaneous DownBeat reviewer, criticized the thinness of the audio quality and commented on the ordinariness of the original compositions, with the exceptions of "Liggin'" and the title track.

== Track listing ==
All compositions by Joe Harriott except as indicated

1. "Still Goofin'" - 2:45
2. "Count Twelve" - 3:38
3. "Señor Blues" (Horace Silver) - 4:00
4. "Southern Horizons" - 6:33 (Harry South)
5. "Jumpin' with Joe" - 3:28 (South)
6. "Liggin'" - 5:48 (South)
7. "Caravan" (Duke Ellington, Juan Tizol, Irving Mills) - 5:40
8. "You Go to My Head" (J. Fred Coots, Haven Gillespie) - 6:32
9. "Tuesday Morning Swing" - 3:00

== Personnel ==
- Joe Harriott – alto saxophone
- Hank Shaw – trumpet (tracks 1–3, 5)
- Shake Keane – trumpet, flugelhorn (tracks 4, 6–9)
- Harry South – piano
- Coleridge Goode – bass
- Bobby Orr – drums
- Frank Holder – bongos (tracks 4, 7)
