= Richard Fairhurst =

Jazz pianist

Richard Fairhust is a British jazz pianist. He was awarded a scholarship to study jazz piano at The New School, New York. He is sponsored by Steinway & Sons. He started piano aged 15, and won the Pat Smythe (pianist) award

He was awarded Daily Telegraph Young Jazz Pianist of the Year Award in 1994.

In 1998, he released "Formic" with his band Hungry Ants.

“Myrmidons” album was released in 2001

In 2004, he won the Best Work category of the BBC Jazz Awards.

In 2010, he released "Triptych: Amusia". He also performed at BBC Radio Three's Celebration of British Jazz

In 2012, he released "Postcards from Pushkin" with trumpet player Tom Arthurs.

In 2015, he recorded a piano duo album with fellow British jazz pianist John Taylor.

== Discography ==
=== As leader ===
Date	Line-up	Album title	Label	Notes
1998	quartet, Tim Giles, John Surman, Tim Harries, Rob Townsend	Formic	Babel	

=== Awards ===
Year Awarded	Institution	Award	Notes
2004	BBC Jazz Award	Best New Work	
