= Pop Makes Progress =

Studio album by Tony Coe
- Released: May 1970
- Recorded: October 12, 1963
- Genre: Jazz, Orchestral pop
- Label: Chapter One
- Producer: Les Reed

Tony Coe chronology
| Sax With Sex (1968) | Pop Makes Progress (1970) | With Brian Lemon Trio (1971) |

Pop Makes Progress is a 1970 studio album featuring Tony Coe, arranged and conducted by Robert Farnon.

== Production ==
As explained in the album's liner notes, this project was the brainchild of songwriter-record producer Les Reed, who, having been "a longtime admirer of the composing-arranging ability of Robert Farnon and the jazz inventiveness of Tony Coe", suddenly realized that a collaboration between these two would make an ideal addition to the catalogue of Reed's recently formed record label, Chapter One. With both parties proving more than amenable, the project was evidently realized with little difficulty.

== Reception ==
Professional ratings
Review scores
| Source | Rating |
|---|---|
| The Encyclopedia of Popular Music | 3/5 stars |
| The Guardian | Unfavorable |
| The Gramohpone | Favorable |
| The Mail | Favorable |
| The Miami News | Unfavorable |

Sam Peters of The Guardian hails the "imaginative pairing" of reedman Coe and "that wonderfully discreet arranger Robert Farnon", while Peter Sykes of The Mail singles out Side 2's opening track, Scarborough Fair, as "a model for young arrangers."

The ten tracks, with Coe playing tenor sax on nine, clarinet on the other, bear all the Farnon trademarks; clean voicing of brass and reeds, impeccable string writing, a thorough understanding of the principle of swing, and absolute good taste. He never intrudes. His charts support, cajole and comfort the soloist.

PMP was also praised by Gramophone's Roger Wimbush, who named it his "pick" for June 1970. On the other hand, neither Miami News music editor Terry Johnson King nor Jackie Kendrick of the Esher News and Mail was very much impressed, with each reviewer's opening salvo consisting of a none too flattering variation on the album's title (King opting for "Pop Makes Regress", and Kendrick, simply "Retarded Jazz". (Note: The latter phrase, it should be noted, is literally title of Kendrick's piece, rather than anything found within the body of her review. Thus, the arguably regrettable choice of words was almost certainly not Kendrick's, but rather that of the copy editor/headline writer. Fortunately, Kendrick's intended meaning—"POP might have made progress, but jazz is retarded by the Chapter One release"—is immediately stated, and reiterated in conclusion: "All in all, an album of good background listening, but too much schmaltzy pop and too little jazz.")) That said, King and Kendrick do find at least some isolated highlights, with King singling out the album's final track, Walk On By, which "fares well at their hands", and Kendrick opting for the two Simon & Garfunkel covers that open Side 2: "Scarborough Fair", "with its mock medieval feeling and well-thought-out solo", and "Mrs. Robinson", "the only number on the whole set which swung".

Decades later, Colin Larkin, in his Encyclopedia of Popular Music, awarded the album three stars.

== Track listing ==
1. "There Will Never Be" (Perry Botkin Jr., Gil Garfield) – 2:59
2. "Wives and Lovers" (Burt Bacharach, Hal David) – 4:15
3. "Yesterday" (John Lennon, Paul McCartney ) – 2:57
4. "There's a Kind of Hush" (Les Reed, Geoff Stevens) – 2:43
5. "If We Lived On Top of a Mountain" (Les Reed, Barry Mason) – 3:07
6. "Scarborough Fair" (Traditional, arr. Paul Simon) – 3:45
7. "Mrs. Robinson" (Paul Simon) – 2:35
8. "Up, Up and Away" (Jimmy Webb) – 3:55
9. "Blue Theme" (Robert Farnon) – 4:03
10. "Walk On By" (Bacharach, David) – 4:31

== Personnel ==
- Tony Coe – tenor sax; clarinet on "Mrs. Robinson"
- Stan Roderick – trumpet
- Don Lusher – trombone
- Dennis Wilson – piano
- Bill McGuffie – piano (solo on "Yesterday")
- Bobby Orr – drums
- Robert Farnon – arranger, conductor
- Jack Baverstock, Les Reed – producer
