= Tony Coe =

English jazz musician (1934–2023)

- Born: Anthony George Coe; 29 November 1934; Canterbury, Kent, England
- Died: 16 March 2023 (aged 88) Canterbury, Kent. England
- Genres: Jazz
- Occupations: Musician; Composer
- Instruments: Clarinet; Bass clarinet Flute; Saxophones
- Years active: 1953–2023
- Labels: Storyville; Hep; Hathut
- Formerly of: The Lonely Bears; The Melody Four
- Website: Official website

Anthony George Coe (29 November 1934 – 16 March 2023) was an English jazz musician who played clarinet, bass clarinet, and flute as well as soprano, alto, and tenor saxophones.

== Career ==
Born in Canterbury, Kent, England, Coe started out on clarinet and was self-taught on tenor saxophone. At just 15 years of age in 1949 he played in his school's (Simon Langton Grammar School for Boys) trad band and two years later, aged 17, became a full professional with Joe Daniels. In 1953, aged 18, he joined the army where he played clarinet in the Military band and saxophone with the unit Dance Band. After demob in 1955 he spent some time in France with the Micky Bryan Band (Micky on piano, Gerry Salisbury (valve trombone), Harry Bryan (trumpet), Lennie Hastings on drums, and Coe on clarinet), before rejoining Joe Daniels. In 1957 Tony's father went to see Humphrey Lyttelton and, as a result, Tony spent just over four years with Humphrey's band from 1957 to the end of 1961. This was a period when Coe was brought to the attention of critics and fans as well as giving him some degree of international fame.

He left Lyttleton at the end of 1961 to form his own outfit. As leader, his notable albums in this period include 1967's Tony's Basement for Denis Preston, a combination of jazz players and string quartet which "suits his evenness of tone and highly personal sound perfectly, and which recalls Stan Getz's beautiful Focus".

In 1965, Coe was invited to join Count Basie's band (later saying: "I'm glad it didn't come off – I would have lasted about a fortnight") and has since played with the John Dankworth Orchestra, the Kenny Clarke/Francy Boland Big Band, Derek Bailey's free improvisation group Company, Stan Tracey, Michael Gibbs, Stan Getz, Dizzy Gillespie, and Bob Brookmeyer, and performed under Pierre Boulez as well as leading a series of groups of his own, including Coe Oxley & Co with drummer Tony Oxley. Another recording with Denis Preston is his "Third Stream masterpiece" Zeitgeist from 1977. He played saxophone on John Martyn's 1973 album Solid Air and clarinet on Paul McCartney's recording of "I'll Give You a Ring", released in 1982.

Coe also worked with the Matrix, a small ensemble formed by clarinettist Alan Hacker, with a wide-ranging repertoire of early, classical, and contemporary music, the Danish Radio Big Band, Metropole Orchestra and Skymasters in the Netherlands. He has worked additionally with the Mike Gibbs big band and the United Jazz + Rock Ensemble. As leader, a career highlight from 1989 is the Canterbury Song album featuring the American pianist Horace Parlan.

Coe recorded on soundtracks for several films, including Superman II, Victor/Victoria, Nous irons tous au paradis, Leaving Las Vegas, Le Plus beau métier du monde and The Loss of Sexual Innocence. He also composed the film score for Camomille.

Coe, who lived in Canterbury, died on 16 March 2023, at the age of 88.

== Awards and honours ==
In 1976, a grant from the Arts Council enabled him to write Zeitgeist - Based On Poems Of Jill Robin, a large-scale orchestral work fusing jazz and rock elements with techniques from classical music which was recorded on EMI records on 29 and 30 July 1976 at Lansdowne Studios based in Holland Park, London. In 1995 he received an honorary degree and the Danish Jazzpar Prize.

== Discography ==
=== As leader ===
- Swingin' Till the Girls Come Home with the Tony Coe Quintet (Philips, 1962)
- Tony's Basement with the Lansdowne String Quartet (Columbia, 1967)
- Sax with Sex (Metronome, 1968, repackaging of Tony's Basement)
- Pop Makes Progress with Robert Farnon (Chapter One, 1970)
- With Brian Lemon Trio (77 Records, 1971)
- Zeitgeist: Based on Poems of Jill Robin (EMI, 1977)
- Coe-Existence (Lee Lambert, 1978)
- Time with Derek Bailey (Incus, 1979)
- Get It Together with Al Grey (Pizza Express, 1979)
- Tournée Du Chat (nato, 1983)
- Le Chat Se Retourne (nato, 1984)
- Mainly Mancini (Chabada, 1985)
- Alernate Cake (nato, 1985 - two tracks)
- Joyeux Noël with Norma Winstone (nato, 1987 - one track)
- Mer De Chine (nato, 1988)
- Canterbury Song (Hot House, 1989)
- Bandes originales du journal de Spirou (nato, 1989 - two tracks)
- Les Voix D'Itxassou (nato, 1990)
- Les Sources Bleues with Tony Hymas, Chris Laurence (nato, 1991)
- Les films de ma ville (nato, 1994 - one track)
- Captain Coe's Famous Racearound with Bob Brookmeyer (Storyville, 1996)
- Buenaventura Durruti with Tony Hymas, Beñat Achiary, Abel Paz (nato, 1996 - two tracks)
- In Concert with John Horler, Malcolm Creese (ABCDs, 1997)
- Jazz Piquant N'oublie Jamais with Tina May (Doz, 1998)
- Days of Wine and Roses with Alan Barnes (Zephyr, 1998)
- Street of Dreams with Warren Vaché (Zephyr, 1999)
- Jumpin with Warren Vaché, Alan Barnes (Zephyr, 1999)
- Sun, Moon, and Stars with Alan Hacker (Zah Zah, 1999)
- British-American Blue with Roger Kellaway (Between the Lines, 2000)
- Dreams with Gerard Presencer, Brian Lemon, Dave Green (Zephyr, 2001)
- What in the World with Richard Sinclair, David Rees Williams (Sinclair Songs, 2003)
- More Than You Know with Tina May, Nikki Iles (33 Records, 2004)
- The Buds of Time, with the Delmé String Quartet (Jazz in Britain, 2025, recorded August 1979 and May 1980)

=== With the Melody Four ===
(as co-leader with Steve Beresford and Lol Coxhill)

- Les Millions D'Arlequin / La Paloma (Chabada, 1984)
- Love Plays Such Funny Games (Chabada, 1984)
- The Melody Four? Si Señor! (Chabada, 1985)
- Alernate Cake (nato, 1985 - one track)
- T.V.? Mais Oui! (Chabada, 1986)
- Hello! We Must Be Going (Chabada, 1987)
- Joyeux Noël with Norma Winstone (nato, 1987 - one track)
- Shopping For Melodies (Chabada, 1988)
- Les films de ma ville (nato, 1994 - eight tracks)

=== With the Lonely Bears ===
(as co-leader with Tony Hymas, Hugh Burns and Terry Bozzio)

- The Lonely Bears (nato, 1991)
- Injustice (nato, 1992)
- The Bears are running (nato, 1994)

=== As sideman ===
With Steve Beresford

- 1985: Eleven Songs for Doris Day (Chabada)
- 1987: Kazuko Hohki chante Brigitte Bardot (Chabada)
- 1988: L'Extraordinaire Jardin De Charles Trenet (Chabada)
- 1989: Pentimento (Cinenato)
- 1996: Cue Sheets (Tzadik)

With the Kenny Clarke/Francy Boland Big Band

- 1968: Latin Kaleidoscope (MPS)
- 1968: All Smiles (MPS)
- 1969: Faces (MPS)
- 1969: All Blues (MPS)
- 1969: Fellini 712 (MPS)
- 1969: More Smiles (MPS)
- 1969: At Her Majesty's Pleasure
- 1969: Let's Face the Music and Dance
- 1969: Live at Ronnie Scott's
- 1969: Rue Chaptal
- 1969: Volcano
- 1971: Off Limits (Polydor)
- 1971: Change of Scenes with Stan Getz (Verve)
- 1971: Second Greatest Jazz Big Band in the World (Black Lion)
- 1973: Big Band Sound of Kenny Clarke & Francy Boland
- 1975: Open Door (Muse)
- 1976: November Girl with Carmen McRae (Black Lion)
- 1976: Live at Ronnie Scotts (MPS)
- 1988: Meets the Francy Boland Kenny Clark Big Band with Gitte Hænning (veraBra)
- 1992: Clarke Boland Big Band en Concert avec Europe 1 (Tréma)
- 1999: Our Kinda Strauss

With Georgie Fame

- 1966: Sound Venture (Columbia)
- 1967: The Two Faces of Fame (CBS)
- 1968: The Third Face of Fame (CBS)

With Tony Hymas

- 1988: Flying Fortress (nato)
- 1990: Oyate (nato)
- 1995: Remake of the American Dream (nato)

With Franz Koglmann

- 1990: A White Line (hatART)
- 1991: The Use of Memory (hatART)
- 1991: L'Heure Bleue (hatART)
- 1993: Cantos I-IV (hatART)
- 1995: We Thought About Duke with Lee Konitz (hatART)
- 1998: Make Believe
- 1999: An Affair With Strauss (Between the Lines)
- 2001: Don't Play Just Be (Between the Lines)
- 2001: O Moon My Pin-Up (hatOLOGY)
- 2003: Fear Death by Water (Between the Lines)
- 2005: Let's Make Love (Between the Lines)
- 2009: Lo-Lee-Ta: Music on Nabokov

With Humphrey Lyttelton

- 1957: Here's Humph! (Parlophone)
- 1960: Blues in the Night (Columbia)
- 1965: Humphrey Lyttelton and His Band
- 1971: Duke Ellington Classics (Black Lion)
- 2001: The Humphrey Lyttelton Big Band with Jimmy Rushing
- 2002: Humph Bruce & Sandy Swing at the BBC:
- 2003: A Night in Oxford Street
- 2005: Humph Dedicates (Vocalion)
- 2013: Live at the Nottingham Jazz Festival 1972 (Calligraph)

With Mike McGear

- 1972: Woman
- 1974: McGear (Warner Bros.)

With Stan Tracey

- 1968 We Love You Madly
- 1969 Wisdom in the Wings
- 1969 The Seven Ages of Man
- 1981 The Crompton Suite
- 1983 Stan Tracey Now
- 1989 Genesis and more

With Norma Winstone

- 1986: Somewhere Called Home
- 1998: Manhattan in the Rain

With others

- 1966: Black Marigolds, Michael Garrick (Argo)
- 1969: Windmill Tilter: The Story of Don Quixote, John Dankworth/Kenny Wheeler
- 1971: Mirrors, Benny Bailey (Freedom)
- 1972: Bootleg Him!, Alexis Korner (Warner)
- 1973: For Girls Who Grow Plump in the Night, Caravan (Deram)
- 1973: Labyrinth, Nucleus
- 1973: Nigel Lived, Murray Head
- 1973: Solid Air, John Martyn
- 1974: Krysia, Krysia Kocjan
- 1974: Living on a Back Street, The Spencer Davis Group
- 1974: Pinball, Brian Protheroe
- 1974: The Road of Silk, Pete Atkin
- 1975: Floresta Canto, Phil Woods
- 1975: Only Chrome-Waterfall Orchestra, Mike Gibbs
- 1976: Kaleidoscope of Rainbows, Neil Ardley
- 1976: Terminator, Nick Ingman
- 1978: A Crazy Steal, The Hollies
- 1978: Clark After Dark: The Ballad Album, Clark Terry
- 1979: Harmony of the Spheres, Neil Ardley
- 1982: Tug of War, Paul McCartney
- 1983: Visit with the Great Spirit, Bob Moses
- 1983: Poemas de Federico Garcia Lorca, Violeta Ferrer (nato)
- 1984: Berlin Djungle, Peter Brötzmann
- 1984: I'm Alright, Loudon Wainwright III
- 1984: The Mystery of Man, Sarah Vaughan
- 1988: Look at me, Terry Day (nato)
- 1989: For Heaven's Sake, Benny Bailey
- 1994: Jazz Tete a Tete, Tubby Hayes
- 1994: R.S.V.P., Richard Sinclair
- 1994: View from the Edge, Theo Travis
- 1996: What in the World, Richard Sinclair
- 1996: Cue Sheets, Steve Beresford (Tzadik)
- 1998: N'Oublie Jamais, Tina May
- 1998: Ridin' High: The British Sessions 1960–1971, Cleo Laine
- 1999: Sun Moon & Stars, Alan Hacker
- 2000: Where But for Caravan Would I?, Caravan
- 2001: Easy to Remember, Joe Temperley
- 2002: At the BBC Vol. 2: More Wireless Days, Chris Barber
- 2002: In the Evening, Sandy Brown
- 2002: Labyrinth, Ian Carr/Nucleus
- 2002: Songs for Sandy, Digby Fairweather
- 2002: Spectral Soprano, Lol Coxhill
- 2003: Transformations, James Emery/Klangforum Wien/Emilio Pomárico
- 2006: Dhammapada, John Mayer
- 2006: Jazz Icons: Live in '58 & '70, Dizzy Gillespie
- 2007: Dixie Band Stomp, Joe Daniels
- 2008: Etudes/Radha Krishna, John Mayer
- 2008: Harlem Airshaft: The Music of Duke Ellington, Alan Barnes
- 2015: Crescendo in Duke, Benoit Delbecq (nato)
- 2015: A Good Time Was Had By All, Danish Radio Big Band
