= Trevor Tomkins =

English jazz drummer (1941–2022)

- Born: Trevor Ramsey Tomkins; 12 May 1941; London, England
- Died: 9 September 2022 (aged 81)
- Genre: Jazz
- Occupation: Musician
- Instrument: Drums
- Years active: 1962–2022

Trevor Ramsey Tomkins (12 May 1941 – 9 September 2022) was an English jazz drummer, best known for his work in a number of bands in the 1970s such as Gilgamesh.

== Biography ==
Tomkins was born in London and studied music at the Guildhall School of Music. He initially learned to play trombone as a teenager before choosing drums on which he made his first professional appearance.

In 1962, he joined Don Rendell working with the Rendell and Ian Carr's quintet for seven years until 1969. He recorded several albums with pianist Michael Garrick and Don Rendell in the late 1960s and early 1970s. In the 1970s, he worked with Ian Carr's Nucleus, Giles Farnaby's Dream Band, David Becker and Henry Lowther's Quaternity. He was a popular choice for visiting musicians including Sonny Stitt, Phil Woods and Lee Konitz. He appears on the 1971 album First Wind by Frank Ricotti and Mike de Albuquerque and on Tony Coe's 1978 album, Coe-Existence.

Tomkins was the first cousin of Roy Budd (jazz pianist and film composer of Get Carter fame), and Peter C. Budd (jazz guitarist living in Chicago), and was a member of various trios and other line-ups with his cousin Roy.

In 1982 he played on the album Before a Word Is Said with Alan Gowen, Phil Miller and Richard Sinclair. The album was released on CD in 1995.

Tomkins died on 9 September 2022, at the age of 81.
