= Phil Seamen =

English jazz drummer (1926–1972)

- Born: Philip William Seamen; 28 August 1926; Burton upon Trent, Staffordshire, England
- Died: 13 October 1972 (aged 46) Lambeth, South London, England
- Genres: Jazz; jazz rock
- Occupation: Musician
- Instrument: Drums
- Years active: 1944–1972

Philip William Seamen (28 August 1926 – 13 October 1972) was an English jazz drummer.

With a background in big band music, Seamen played and recorded in a wide range of musical contexts with virtually every key figure of 1950s and 1960s British jazz. Notable examples included Joe Harriott, Tubby Hayes, Stan Tracey, Ronnie Scott, Denny Termer, Dick Morrissey, Harold McNair, Don Rendell, Victor Feldman, Dizzy Reece, Tony Coe, Tony Lee, and George Chisholm, among others. Later in his career he worked with Alexis Korner and Georgie Fame, and had a spell with Ginger Baker's Air Force, the leader of the band being Seamen's foremost disciple. Addiction to alcohol and hard drugs, most particularly and notably intravenous heroin addictions, severely damaged his career.

== Early career ==
Seamen began playing drums at the age of six, turning professional at the age of 18 by joining Nat Gonella and his Georgians in 1944. In 1946, aged 20, he spent a year with Gordon Homer at the Coronation Ballroom in Ramsgate. Brian Fahey, composer, stated, "This was a very good big band. I wrote a lot of scores for it. I did my first broadcast with Gordon. Phil Seamen, only 20 then, was the drummer and it was obvious to me that he was destined to become one of the most exciting drummers in the world." He joined the Tommy Sampson Orchestra in 1948, and by 1949, Seamen and tenor saxist Danny Moss had formed a bebop quintet from within the ranks and which was featured on a radio broadcast by the orchestra in September 1949.

He then went on to play in the Joe Loss Orchestra for about 14 months. Then the top job with Jack Parnell from 1951 until midway 1954. Seamen was much sought after during the 1950s, also playing in Kenny Graham's AfroCubism projects from 1952 to 1958, from 1954 onwards with the Joe Harriott Quartet, the Ronnie Scott Orchestra and Sextet, and an ever extending list including Dizzy Reece, Victor Feldman, Jimmy Deuchar, Kenny Baker, Vic Ash, Don Rendell, Stan Tracey, Laurie Johnson, as well as blues stars Big Bill Broonzy and Josh White, countless sessions.

He married the young West End dancer Leonie Franklin in 1956, whom he had met while with Parnell, working together in the show Jazz Wagon. On 8 February 1957, Seamen was finally on his way to America, about to fulfil a lifelong dream. The Ronnie Scott Sextet were going over on the Queen Mary to do a tour as part of a Musicians' Union exchange deal. But going through customs in Southampton prior to boarding, custom officiers took him aside and he was found to be in possession of drugs; he never visited the States. In 1958, the West End production of West Side Story opened with him - Leonard Bernstein reputedly specifically asked for him and the producers hired him.

== Seamen in the 1960s ==
During the first half of the 1960s, he worked often with Tubby Hayes, and Joe Harriott. In 1962, he played a couple of nights with Dexter Gordon at Ronnie Scott's, recorded with Carmen McRae, in 1963 played R&B with Alexis Korner and 1964 with Georgie Fame. He started teaching in 1962, one of his pupils being Ginger Baker, who went on to influence a whole generation of rock drummers. However, his heroin addiction meant his health was deteriorating, and increasingly many bandleaders would no longer hire him; his employment was limited to occasional sit-ins at Ronnie Scott's. Notable exceptions were with Freddie Hubbard in 1964 and Roland Kirk in 1967 (followed by a UK tour).

In the 1960s, Phil Seamen made appearances at the Midland Jazz Club in Birmingham at Digbeth Civic Hall. He can also be heard from this time on the album "Clarinet Jamboree" with clarinet players Acker Bilk, Terry Lightfoot, Sandy Brown and Archie Semple. He accompanies Sandy Brown, and plays in a remarkable modern jazz style in "The Last Western".

== 1970s ==
A photograph of Seamen is included in the collection at the National Portrait Gallery.

== Death ==
Phil Seaman died in October 1972 in his sleep at his home in Old Paradise Street Lambeth, South London, at the age of 46. His ashes were scattered at Golders Green Crematorium.

== Discography ==
=== As leader ===
- Now! ... Live! (Verve 1968) Phil Seamen (with Tony Lee - piano and Tony Archer - bass)
- Phil Seamen meets Eddie Gomez (Saga 1968) (with Tony Lee - piano, Eddie Gómez - bass
- Phil on Drums (Decibel 1971) (with Ray Crane - trumpet, Gerry Salisbury - cornet, Keith Christie, John Picard - trombones, Sandy Brown - clarinet, Tommy Whittle - tenor sax, Brian Lemon - piano, Lennie Bush - bass)
- The Phil Seamen Story (Decibel 1972) (Phil talks and plays)

=== As sideman ===
With Victor Feldman with Kenny Graham's Afro-Cubists

- Experiment In Time (Esquire, 1955)

With Victor Feldman

- Suite Sixteen (Contemporary, 1955 [1958])

With Joe Harriott

- Free Form (Jazzland, 1960)
- Abstract (Capitol, 1962)

With Alexis Korner's Blues Incorporated

- Alexis Korner's Blues Incorporated (Decca 1963, issued in 1965)

With Dick Morrissey

- Storm Warning! (Fontana, 1965)

With Georgie Fame

- Sound Venture (Columbia, 1966)

=== Posthumous releases ===
- The Late Great Phil Seamen (SWP Records 2009) (compilation of recordings from between 1953 and 1972, with bands led by Jack Parnell, Victor Feldman, Dizzy Reece, Ronnie Scott, Stan Tracey, Harold McNair, Jimmy Witherspoon, Joe Harriott, Kenny Graham, Tony Coe)
