= Tim Giles =

Tim Giles is a jazz drummer who won the Daily Telegraph Young Composer of the Year Award in 1992 at the age of 12 and has gone on to perform with a variety of jazz musicians. Giles was a member of Richard Fairhurst's Hungry Ants, and later formed his own group, Fraud, with James Allsopp. Fraud won the Jazz on 3 Innovation Award at the 2008 BBC Jazz Awards.
