= Ray Crane =

British jazz trumpeter

Raymond "Ray" Crane (born October 31, 1930, Skegness - died June 29, 1994) was a British jazz trumpeter.

Crane played locally in his twenties and early thirties, then became a member of Bruce Turner's band in 1963, which significantly raised his profile. He later played in the ensembles of Brian Lemon and Stan Greig, and worked with touring American trumpeters such as Red Allen, Bill Coleman, and Ray Nance. He also worked as a musical pedagogue, teaching and leading a youth jazz band which graduated Martin Taylor and Guy Barker.
