= Ian Carr =

Scottish jazz musician (1933–2009)

- Born: Ian Henry Randall Carr; 21 April 1933; Dumfries, Scotland
- Died: 25 February 2009 (aged 75)
- Genres: Jazz; jazz fusion
- Occupations: Musician, composer, writer, educator
- Instrument: Trumpet
- Label: Vertigo

Ian Carr (21 April 1933 – 25 February 2009) was a Scottish jazz musician, composer, writer, and educator. Carr performed and recorded with the Rendell-Carr quintet and jazz-fusion band Nucleus, and was an associate professor at the Guildhall School of Music and Drama in London. He also wrote biographies of musicians Keith Jarrett and Miles Davis.

== Early years ==
Ian Henry Randall Carr was born in Dumfries, Scotland, the elder brother of Mike Carr. From 1952 to 1956, Carr attended King's College, now Newcastle University, where he read English Literature, followed by a diploma in education.

== Musical career ==
At the age of 17, Carr started to teach himself trumpet. After university he joined his brother in a Newcastle band, the EmCee Five, from 1960 to 1962, before moving to London, where he played in a quintet co-led by Don Rendell, with pianist Michael Garrick, bassist Dave Green, and drummer Trevor Tomkins. In its six years (1963–1969) the Rendell–Carr Quintet recorded five albums and performed internationally. All records originally issued by EMI have been re-released. During the 1960s he also played with the New Jazz Orchestra under the direction of Neil Ardley and recorded an album with altoist Joe Harriott.

After leaving the quintet, Carr went on to form the ground-breaking jazz-rock band Nucleus. This led to the release of 12 albums (some under the band's name, some under Carr's), and a successful international career. In their first year Nucleus won first prize at the Montreux Jazz Festival, released their first album, Elastic Rock, and performed at both the Newport Jazz Festival and the Village Gate jazz club. Carr also played with the United Jazz + Rock Ensemble from 1975.

Carr worked as a session musician in non-jazz contexts, with Nico, No-Man, Faultline, and others. He also doubled on flugelhorn.

== Writing and academic career ==
Apart from writing a regular column for the BBC Music Magazine, Carr wrote biographies of the jazz musicians Keith Jarrett and Miles Davis. Carr was also the co-author of the reference work The Rough Guide to Jazz, which has passed through four editions from 1994 (originally Jazz, The Essential Companion, 1988). In addition he contributed sleeve notes for the albums of other musicians (e.g. Indo-Jazz Fusions by Joe Harriott and John Mayer).

In 1987, Carr was appointed associate professor at the Guildhall School of Music and Drama in London, where he taught composition and performance, especially improvisation. He was founder of the jazz workshop at the Inter Action community arts centre, where pianist Julian Joseph, among others, was one of his students.

== Death ==
Ian Carr died aged 75 on 25 February 2009, having suffered from Alzheimer's disease. A memorial service was held at Golders Green Crematorium in London the following month. In addition to fellow Nucleus member Geoff Castle, speakers at the service included artist Gerald Laing, author, critic and broadcaster Alyn Shipton, Mike Dibb (with whom Carr collaborated on two films on Miles Davis and Keith Jarrett) and Carr's students Julian Joseph, Sara Dillon and Nikki Yeoh.

== Discography ==
=== Rendell–Carr Quintet ===
As co-leader with Don Rendell

- Shades of Blue (Columbia, 1964)
- Dusk Fire (Columbia, 1966)
- Phase III (Columbia, 1968)
- Live (Columbia, 1969) – live
- Change Is (Columbia, 1969)
- Live in London (Harkit, 2003) – live rec. 1965
- Original 1964–68 Recordings / Live from the Antibes Jazz Festival (Spotlite, 2007) – live, compilation
- Live at the Union 1966 (Reel, 2010) – live rec. 1966
- Live at Klooks Kleek (Record Collector Magazine, 2017)[2LP] – live rec. 1963

=== Nucleus ===
As leader of Nucleus

- Elastic Rock (Vertigo, 1970)
- We'll Talk about It Later (Vertigo, 1971)
- Solar Plexus (Vertigo, 1971) – released as a "Ian Carr with Nucleus" album.
- Labyrinth (Vertigo, 1973) – released as a "Ian Carr with Nucleus" album
- Roots (Vertigo, 1973) – released as a "Ian Carr's Nucleus" album
- Under the Sun (Vertigo, 1974)
- Snakehips Etcetera (Vertigo, 1975)
- Alleycat (Vertigo, 1975)
- In Flagranti Delicto (Capitol, 1977) – released as a "Ian Carr's Nucleus" album
- Out of the Long Dark (Capitol, 1979) – released as a "Ian Carr's Nucleus" album
- Awakening (Mood, 1980) – released as a "Ian Carr's Nucleus" album
- Jazz-London 29 / 30 (BBC Transcription Service, 1983) – live, split album with The Brian Lemon Quartet.
- Live at the Theaterhaus (Mood, 1985) – live, released as a "Ian Carr's Nucleus" album.
- Live in Bremen (Cuneiform, 2003)[2CD] – live rec. 1971
- The Pretty Redhead (Hux, 2003) – rec. 1971, 1982
- Hemispheres (Hux, 2006) – live rec. 1970–71
- UK Tour '76 (Major League Productions, 2006)[2CD] – live rec. 1976 at Loughborough University
- Live in Europe 1970-71 (Hux, 2009) – live rec. 1970–71
- Live 1970 with Leon Thomas (Gearbox, 2014)[2LP] – live rec. 1970 at Montreux Jazz Festival

Compilations

- Direct Hits (Vertigo, 1976) – rec. 1970–74, released as a "Ian Carr's Nucleus" album.
- Three of a Kind (Gonzo Multimedia, 2015) – rec. 1976–83

=== As leader ===
- Belladonna (Vertigo, 1972)
- Old Heartland (MMC, 1988)
- Sounds and Sweet Airs (That Give Delight and Hurt Not) (Celestial Harmonies, 1994) – rec. 1992

=== As co-leader or sideman ===
- Emcee Five – Take Five (Columbia, 1962)
- Roy Budd – "'Roy Budd" (Pye, 1965)[7"]
- New Jazz Orchestra – Western Reunion (Decca, 1965)
- with Jeff Clyne – Springboard (Polydor, 1969) – rec. 1966
- New Jazz Orchestra – Le Déjeuner sur l'Herbe (Verve, 1969)
- The Joe Harriott / Amancio D'Silva Quartet – Hum-Dono (Columbia, 1969)
- with Neil Ardley & Don Rendell – Variations & Other Aegean Exercises (Columbia, 1970)
- with Neil Ardley, Mike Gibbs, and Stan Tracey – Power (Argo, 1974)[2LP]
- with the Algemona Quartetto – Jazz 80 (Mia, 1980)
- Emcee Five – Bebop 61: Bebop from the East Coast 1960/1962 (Birdland, 1987) – rec. 1961–67
- George Russell's Living Time Orchestra, The London Concert (Label Bleu, 1990) – live rec. 1989
- Zyklus – Virtual Realities (AMP, 1991)
- Don Rendell, Reunion (Spotlite Jazz, 2002)
- with Jon Hiseman, Barbara Thompson and others, Mike Taylor Remembered (Trunk, 2007) – rec. 1973, a tribute to Mike Taylor
- New Jazz Orchestra – On the Radio: BBC Sessions 1971 (Dusk Fire, 2017)

== Publications ==
- 1973: Music Outside: Contemporary Jazz in Britain. Latimer New Dimensions, ISBN 0-901539-25-2.
  - 2008: 2nd edn., with new postscript and photographs. London: Northway Publications, ISBN 978-0-9550908-6-8.
- 1982: Miles Davis. Quartet / William Morrow & Co, ISBN 0-704-32273-0 / ISBN 0-688-01321-X.
- 1988: Jazz: The Essential Companion, with Digby Fairweather & Brian Priestley. Paladin Books, ISBN 0-586-08530-0
- 1991: Keith Jarrett: The Man and His Music. Grafton Books, ISBN 0-246-13434-8.
- 1999: Miles Davis: The Definitive Biography. Thunder's Mouth Press, ISBN 1-56025-241-3.
- 2004: The Rough Guide to Jazz with Digby Fairweather & Brian Priestley. 3rd ed., Rough Guides Limited, ISBN 1-84353-256-5.

== Bibliography ==
- Alyn Shipton, Out of the Long Dark: The Life of Ian Carr, 2006.
- Roger Farbey, The Music of Ian Carr – A Critical Discography, 2010.
  - Elastic Dream: The Music of Ian Carr – A Critical Discography, 2nd revised edition, 2015.
  - Elastic Dream: The Music of Ian Carr – An Annotated Discography, 3rd revised edition, 2023.
