= Coleridge Goode =

British Jamaican-born jazz bassist (1914–2015)

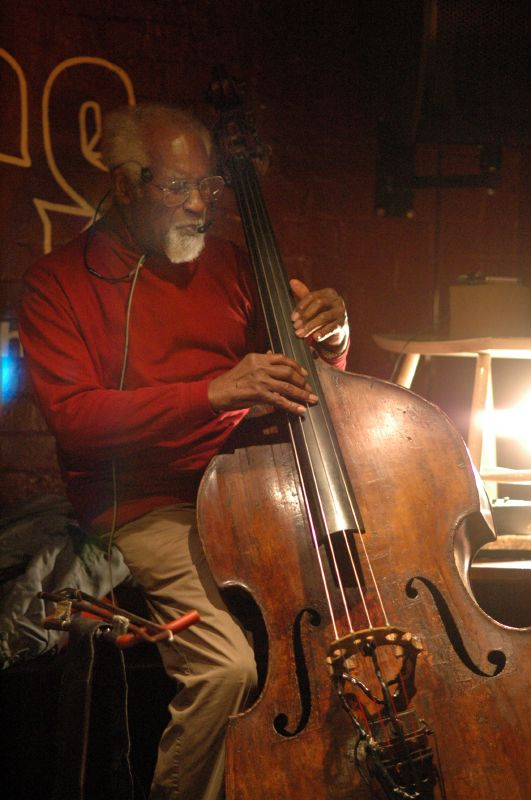

Background information
- Born: Coleridge George Emerson Goode; 29 November 1914; Kingston, Jamaica
- Died: 2 October 2015 (aged 100) London, England
- Genres: Jazz
- Occupation: Double bassist
- Instrument: Double bass
- Formerly of: Joe Harriott, Michael Garrick

George Coleridge Emerson Goode (29 November 1914 – 2 October 2015) was a British Jamaican-born jazz bassist best known for his long collaboration with alto saxophonist Joe Harriott. Goode was a member of Harriott's innovatory jazz quintet throughout its eight-year existence as a regular unit (1958–65). Goode was also involved with the saxophonist's later pioneering blend of jazz and Indian music in Indo-Jazz Fusions, the group Harriott co-led with composer/violinist John Mayer.

== Biography ==
Goode was born in Kingston, Jamaica. His father was a choirmaster and organist who promoted classical choral music in Jamaica and his mother sang in the choir. As Goode recalled: "My name comes from my father putting on a performance of Samuel Coleridge Taylor's Hiawatha's Wedding Feast as a tribute to him.... I was born a year after." Goode came to Britain in 1934 as a 19-year-old student at the Royal Technical College in Glasgow (later the University of Strathclyde), and then went on to read for a degree in engineering at Glasgow University. He was already proficient as an amateur classical violinist but turned to jazz and took up the bass after hearing the music of such stars as Count Basie, Duke Ellington, Billie Holiday and Louis Jordan. Abandoning his plans to return to Jamaica to work as an engineer, Goode decided to embark upon a musical career.

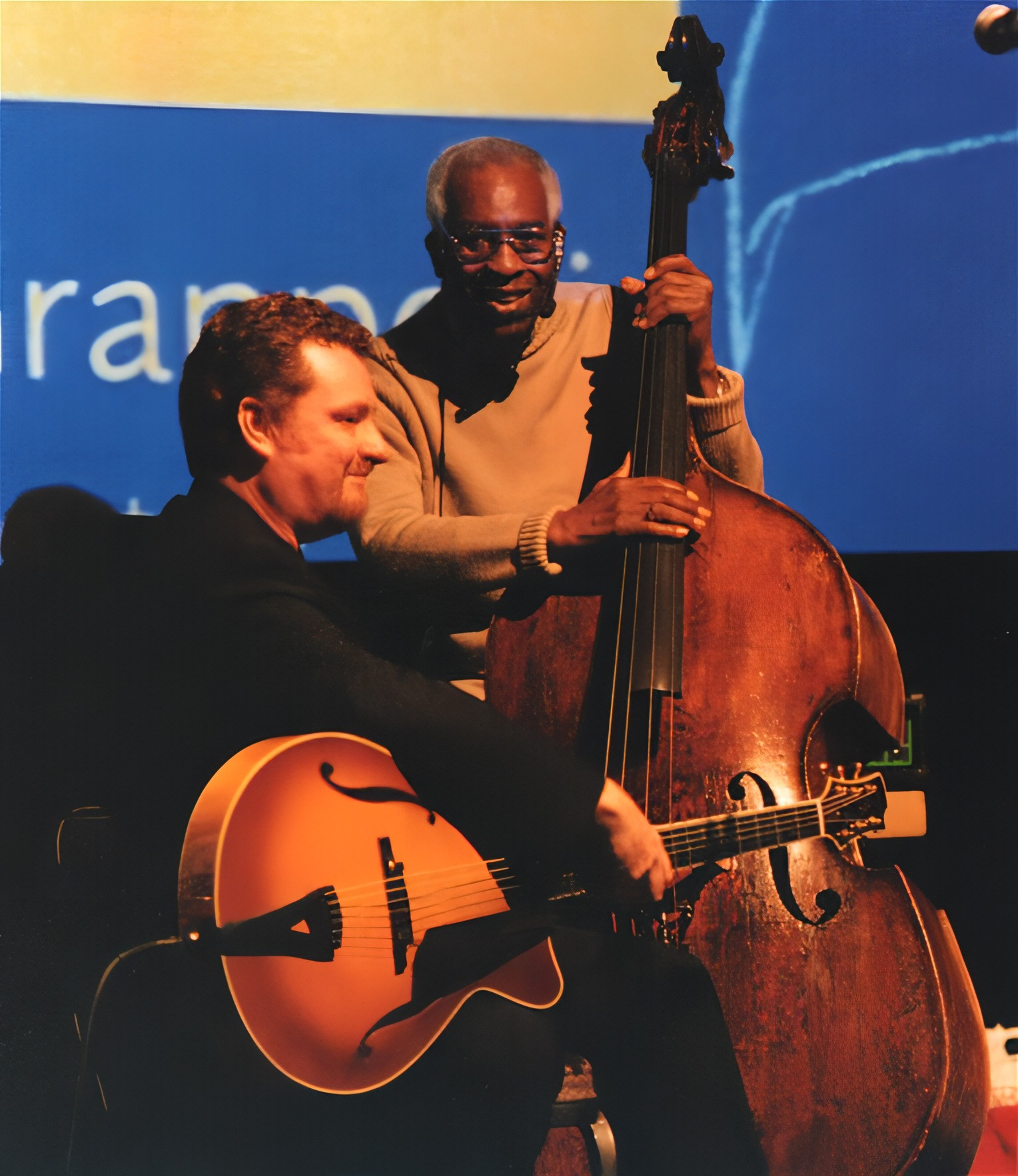
Martin Taylor (left) and Goode in London, 2002, at the launch of the Stéphane Grappelli DVD A Life in the Jazz Century

His primary early influences as a bassist were Walter Page, Slam Stewart and Jimmy Blanton. Moving to London in 1942, Goode subsequently worked with Johnny Claes, Eric Winstone, Lauderic Caton and Dick Katz, became a founder member of the Ray Ellington Quartet and recorded with Django Reinhardt in 1946, alongside Stephane Grappelli. Later Goode played in Tito Burns' sextet and led his own group, before being invited to join Harriott's new band in 1958. In 1967 he recorded with Chris McGregor, Dudu Pukwana, Ronnie Beer, and Laurie Allan on Gwigwi Mrwebi's Mbaqanga Songs. During the 1960s and 1970s, Goode worked extensively with pianist/composer Michael Garrick. Goode was still performing in the house band at Laurie Morgan's Sunday jam sessions at the King's Head in Crouch End into his 90s.

Considered a fine jazz bassist who has worked in Europe, Goode is a link to a heritage of Caribbean contributions to the music. His achievements through a long career have been an inspiration for some leading contemporary black British jazz musicians. In 2002, his autobiography Bass Lines: A Life in Jazz, co-authored with his friend, the academic and jazz writer Roger Cotterrell, not only told his own story but provided vivid memories of Harriott and of the birth of free form jazz in Britain.

== Awards and recognition ==
On 18 May 2011, Goode was honoured with the Services to Jazz Award at the Parliamentary Jazz Awards, held at the House of Commons.

In 2014, the year Goode celebrated turning 100, a special performance was organised for him at the London Jazz Festival, led by Gary Crosby. Goode died the following year, on 2 October 2015.

== Personal life ==
In 1944, Goode married Gertrude Selmeczi, a Jewish refugee from Vienna, Austria, of Hungarian origin; the marriage, lasting 70 years until her death aged 96 in June 2015, produced a daughter Sandy and son James.

== Discography ==
With Michael Garrick

- Promises (Argo, 1965)
- Anthem (Argo, 1965)
- October Woman (Argo, 1965)
- Jazz Praises (Airborne, 1968)
- A Jazz Cantata (Erase, 1969)
- The Heart Is a Lotus (Argo, 1970)
- Mr Smith's Apocalypse (Argo, 1971)
- Troppo (Argo, 1974)
- Rising Stars with Shake Keane (Trunk, 2011)
- Prelude to Heart Is a Lotus (Gearbox, 2013)

With Joe Harriott

- Southern Horizons (Jazzland, 1960)
- Free Form (Jazzland, 1961)
- Abstract (Columbia, 1963)
- Movement (Columbia, 1964)
- High Spirits (Columbia, 1965)
- Indo Jazz Suite (Columbia, 1966)
- Indo Jazz Fusions (Columbia, 1967)
- Indo Jazz Fusions II (Columbia, 1968)
- Swings High (Melodisc, 1970)
- Journey (Moonlight Tunes, 2011)

With others

- Ray Ellington, The Three Bears (Avid, 2000)
- Jade Warrior, Kites (Island, 1976)
- Shake Keane, That's the Noise (Ace of Clubs, 1967)
- John Mayer, Etudes (Sonet, 1969)
- John Mayer, Indo Jazz Fusions (Somethin' Else, 1969)
- Django Reinhardt & Stephane Grappelli, Django Reinhardt & Stephane Grappelly with the Quintet of the Hot Club of France (Ace of Clubs/Decca, 1964)
- Django Reinhardt, Django's Music (Pathe, 1974)
