= Michael Garrick =

English pianist (1933–2011)

Michael Garrick MBE (30 May 1933 – 11 November 2011) was an English jazz pianist and composer, and a pioneer in mixing jazz with poetry recitations and in the use of jazz in large-scale choral works.

== Biography ==
Garrick was born in Enfield, Middlesex, and educated at University College, London, from which he graduated in 1959 with a BA in English literature. As a student there he formed his first quartet, featuring vibraphonist Peter Shade. Recordings of this are on HEP (Chronos and Silhouette, released on Gearbox vinyl). Aside from some lessons at the Ivor Mairants School of Dance Music, Garrick was "an entirely self-taught musician" (he had been expelled from Eleanor B. Franklin-Pike's piano lessons for quoting from "In the Mood" at a pupils' concert), though he attended Berklee College, Boston, as a mature student in the 1970s.

Soon after graduating, Garrick became the musical director of "Poetry & Jazz in Concert", a roadshow devised by poet and publisher Jeremy Robson, and involving writers as diverse as Laurie Lee, Adrian Mitchell, Vernon Scannell, Spike Milligan, Dannie Abse, and John Smith. Garrick's quintet at this time included Joe Harriott and Shake Keane. Garrick came to special prominence in the British contemporary jazz world initially as the pianist with the Don Rendell–Ian Carr quintet from 1965 to 1969, and led his own sextet from 1966.

Garrick is perhaps best known for his jazz-choral works, the first of which he started in 1967. Jazz Praises, an extended religious work for his sextet and a large choir, was performed at St. Paul's Cathedral in London, and elsewhere. With poet John Smith he produced a series of such works, starting in 1969 with Mr Smith's Apocalypse for sextet, speakers, and chorus, which had its premiere at the Farnham Festival. The culmination of this partnership was A Zodiac of Angels, a choral jazz ballet performed opposite Carmina Burana under the baton of Victor Fox in the Opera Theatre Manchester in January 1988 and using symphony orchestra, seven jazz soloists including Norma Winstone, full choir and a dance company. Indian classical music has influenced many of his compositions.

Aside from his performing, recording, and composing, Garrick was heavily involved in jazz education, and held teaching posts at the Royal Academy of Music and at Trinity College of Music, London; he continued to teach at summer schools, both for the Guildhall School of Music and on his own Jazz Academy Vacation Courses, from 1989 at Beechwood in Tunbridge Wells. For many years he took his trio into schools presenting interactive events to introduce children to jazz.

His own record label, Jazz Academy Records, features many albums by his Michael Garrick Jazz Orchestra and has trio, solo, quartet and other small groupings, some including singers Norma Winstone, Anita Wardell and Jacqui Dankworth. In 2009, Garrick began a collaboration with vocalist Nette Robinson. At the time of his death he had also begun to develop work with a quartet including vibraphonist Jim Hart, which would have reworked some of the music of the Modern Jazz Quartet and would have provided an echo of his own first quartet, half a century earlier. That year, he also participated in the release of a 1964 recording, The Girl with Brown Hair, featuring his trio (with Colin Barnes on drums and Dave Green on bass) backing Dick Morrissey.

Garrick was appointed MBE in the 2010 Birthday Honours. He published his autobiography Dusk Fire: Jazz in English Hands, co-written with Trevor Bannister, in the same year.

Garrick died on 11 November 2011 after suffering heart problems for some years.

== Discography ==
=== As leader ===
Recording date	Title / co-leader	Label	Year released	Personnel / Notes
1958	Silhouette	Gearbox	2010	Quartet, with Brian Barnes (drums, vocals), Josephine Stahl (vocals), Peter Shade, Paul Hemmings
1959?	Blues for the Lonely	Columbia	1959	With Joe Harriott, Shake Keane, Jeremy Robson; released as an EP
1959–02, 1960-02, 1960-03	Kronos	Hep	2013	Quartet (with Peter Shade, Paul Hemmings, Brian Barnes) and James Grant Kellas Sax Section
1963?	A Case of Jazz	Airborne	1963	[EP 7"]
1963–03, 1963-06	Poetry and Jazz in Concert (Record 1 & Record 2)	Argo	1964	Quintet, with Dannie Abse, Laurie Lee, Adrian Mitchell and Jeremy Robson, featuring Joe Harriott, Shake Keane. Reissued as Poetry and Jazz in Concert (Vocalion, 2006)[2CD].
1964?	Moonscape	Airborne	1964	Trio, with Dave Green (bass), Colin Barnes (drums) [10"]
1964–11	October Woman	Argo	1965	Quintet, with Shake Keane (trumpet), Joe Harriott (alto sax), Coleridge Goode (bass), Colin Barnes (drums), Elizabethan Singers
1965–05	Promises	Argo	1965	Sexted, with Ian Carr (trumpet, flugelhorn), Joe Harriott (alto sax), Tony Coe (tenor sax, clarinet), Dave Green, Coleridge Goode (bass), Colin Barnes (drums)
1965–05	Before Night/Day with Jeremy Robson	Argo	1966	Released as an EP
1966–01, 1966-02	Black Marigolds	Argo	1966	Septet with Ian Carr (trumpet, flugelhorn), Don Rendell (soprano sax, tenor sax), Joe Harriott (alto sax), Tony Coe (tenor sax), Dave Green (bass), Colin Barnes and Trevor Tomkins (drums), John Smith (poetry)
1968–10	Jazz Praises at St Paul's	Airborne	1968	Sexted
1968	Prelude to Heart Is a Lotus	Gearbox	2013	Sextet, with Ian Carr (trumpet, flugelhorn), Art Themen (soprano sax, tenor sax, clarinet, flute), Don Rendell (soprano sax, tenor sax, flute), Coleridge Goode and Dave Green (bass), Trevor Tomkins (drums), Norma Winstone (vocals)
1969?	Poetry and Jazz 250	Argo	1970	Sexted [2LP]
1969	A Jazz Cantata (For Martin Luther King)	Erase	1969	Commissioned by the Farnham Festival. Text by John Smith
1967–07, 1969-10	A New Serious Music	Rhythm & Blues	2021	
1970–01	The Heart Is A Lotus	Argo	1970	Sextet, with Norma Winstone (vocals)
1971	Mr Smith's Apocalypse	Argo	1971	As Garrick's Fairground
1972–04	Home Stretch Blues	Argo	1972	As Michael Garrick Band with Henry Lowther (trumpet, flugelhorn), Art Themen (soprano sax, tenor sax), Don Rendell (tenor sax, flute), Dave Green (bass), Trevor Tomkins (drums), Norma Winstone (vocals)
1972	Cold Mountain	Argo	1972	Trio, with Dave Green (bass), Trevor Tomkins (drums)
1973	Troppo	Argo	1974	With Henry Lowther (trumpet, flugelhorn), Art Themen (soprano sax, tenor sax), Don Rendell (tenor sax, flute), Coleridge Goode and Dave Green (bass), Trevor Tomkins (drums), Norma Winstone (vocals)
1978	You've Changed	HEP	1981	Trio, with Don Weller, Chris Laurence, Alan Jackson
1993	A Lady in Waiting	Jazz Academy	1994	Trio, with Dave Green (bass), Alan Jackson (drums)
1994–06, 1994-07	Meteors Close at Hand	Jazz Academy	1994	With Andy Bush, Mike Diprose, Ollie Preece, Martin Shaw, Steve Waterman and Ian Wood (trumpet, flugelhorn), Brian Archer, Matt Coleman, Pat Hartley, Bill Mee and Mark Da Silva (trombone), Scott Garland, Jimmy Hastings, Mike Hall, Martin Hathaway, Bob McKay, Mike Page, Jim Tomlinson and Matt Wates (sax), Phil Lee and Colin Oxley (guitar), Paul Moylan (bass), Alan Jackson (drums) [2CD]
1994– 1995	Parting Is Such	Jazz Academy	1995	With Don Rendell (tenor sax), Chris Garrick (violin), Dave Green (bass), Alan Jackson (drums)
1995– 1996	For Love of Duke... and Ronnie	Jazz Academy	1997	Quartet and Orchestra, with Gabriel Garrick, Ollie Preece, Steve Waterman and Ian Wood (trumpet), Brian Archer, Bill Mee and Mark Da Silva (trombone), Mike Hall, Martin Hathaway, Bob McKay, Jim Tomlinson and Matt Wates (sax), Dominic Ashworth (guitar), Paul Moylan (bass), Alan Jackson (drums), Jacqui Dankworth (vocals)
1999	Down on Your Knees	Jazz Academy	2008	Big Band, with Mark Armstrong, Gabriel Garrick, Paul Jayasinha, Martin Shaw and Steve Waterman (trumpet), Brian Archer, Matt Coleman, Dave Holt, Bill Mee, Mark Nightingale and Malcolm Earl Smith (trombone), Paul Booth, Ben Castle, Mike Hall, Bob McKay, Jim Tomlinson and Matt Wates (sax), Dominic Ashworth (guitar), Paul Moylan (bass), Alan Jackson (drums), Anita Wardell (vocals)
2001	The New Quartet	Jazz Academy	2002	The New Quartet, with Martin Hathaway (soprano sax, alto sax), Paul Moylan (bass), Alan Jackson (drums)
2002	Green and Pleasant Land	Jazz Academy	2003	Strings Quartet, with Dominic Ashworth (guitar), Chris Garrick (violin), Paul Moylan (bass); in concert
2003–07	Peter Pan Jazz Dance Suite	Jazz Academy	2003	Jazz Orchestra, with Mark Armstrong, Quentin Collins, Gabriel Garrick, Dave Priseman, and Nick Smart (trumpet), James Adams, Dave Eaglestone, and Mark Da Silva (trombone), Jamie Anderson, Paul Booth, Mick Foster, Martin Hathaway, Bob McKay and Matt Wates (reeds), Dominic Ashworth and Pete Callard (guitar), Paul Moylan (bass), Alan Jackson (drums), Anita Wardell (vocals)
2004	Big Band Harriott	Jazz Academy	2004	Jazz Orchestra
2005	Children of Time	Jazz Academy	2005	Jazz Britannia Orchestra with Norma Winstone (vocals), with Martin Shaw, Steve Waterman and Gabriel Garrick (trumpet), Mark Da Silva, Alastair White and Dave Eaglestone (trombone), Jamie Anderson, Mick Foster, Martin Hathaway, Bob McKay and Matt Wates (sax), Dominic Ashworth (guitar), Paul Moylan (bass), Alan Jackson (drums),
2005	Yet Another Spring	Jazz Academy	2009	Jazz Orchestra with Norma Winstone (vocals), with Martin Shaw, Steve Waterman and Gabriel Garrick (trumpet), Mark Da Silva, Alastair White and Dave Eaglestone (trombone), Jamie Anderson, Mick Foster, Martin Hathaway, Bob McKay and Matt Wates (sax), Dominic Ashworth (guitar), Paul Moylan (bass), Alan Jackson (drums),
2006?	Inspirations	Jazz Academy	2006	The New Quartet, with Martin Hathaway (soprano sax, alto sax), Paul Moylan (bass), Alan Jackson (drums)
2008?	Introducing Mick Garrett-GIGS	Gats Production	2008	Trio
2009?	Lady of the Aurian Wood – A Magic Life of Duke	Jazz Academy	2009	Jazz Orchestra
2010?	Tone Poems	Jazz Academy	2010	Jazz Orchestra
2011	Home Thoughts	Jazz Academy	2011	
2012	Bovingdon Poppies	Garrick Archive	2012	Lyric Ensemble, with Nette Robinson (vocals), Michael Garrick (piano), Tony Woods (soprano, alto sax, alto clarinet, flute), Matt Ridley (bass), Chris Nickolls (drums)
1973 / 1978	Late Autumn Sunshine	My Only Desire Records	2025	All Stars Ensemble, with Norma Winstone vocals; Henry Lowther trumpet, flugelhorn; Art Themen tenor saxophone; Dave Green bass; Trevor Tomkins drums (recorded 1973 and 1978)

Main sources:

Almost all of Garrick's early recordings have been reissued on CD, especially through the Vocalion label. Moonscape was reissued in 2007 on Trunk Records. Albums from the 1990s to 2010 appeared mainly on his Jazz Academy label.

=== As co-leader ===
With The Don Rendell / Ian Carr Quintet

- Dusk Fire (Columbia, 1966)
- Phase III (Columbia, 1968)
- Live (Columbia, 1969)
- Change Is (Columbia, 1969)
- Live in London (Harkit, 2003) – live rec. 1965

=== As sidemen ===
With Nette Robinson

- Remembered Time (Jazz Academy, 2010) – as Michael Garrick Trio

=== Compositions ===
- Praises: a miscellany of religious texts and images for jazz group, organ, and chorus. Recorded in 1965: Simon Preston (organ), Louis Halsey's Elizabethan Singers, and jazz quintet with Joe Harriott (alto sax) and Shake Keane (trumpet)
- Mr Smith's Apocalypse: cantata (poems by John Smith). Commission from Farnham Festival, 1969. Same forces as Praises, plus readers. Recorded in 1970 with the Garrick septet.
- Judas Kiss: the Passion of Christ. Text compiled from the four gospels. Commission from Nottingham Festival, 1971. Same forces as Mr Smith's Apocalypse, with string orchestra added in 1990. Not commercially recorded.
- A Hobbit Suite or Gemstones: suite based on J. R. R. Tolkien The Hobbit, in nine sections. Commission from Mersey Arts, 1973 for jazz sextet, including the voice of Norma Winstone. Later expanded for jazz orchestra. Recorded in 1994 (selections from expanded version).
- Jazz Portraits: an ongoing project from 1975, depicting figures from jazz such as Duke Ellington, John Coltrane, Dizzy Gillespie, McCoy Tyner, Thelonious Monk, and Bill Evans; for large and small ensembles.
- Underground Streams: an after-death soliloquy, with interludes from angels and other heavenly beings. Based on Rudolf Steiner's 1912 lecture-cycle Life between Death and Rebirth. Commission from the Jazz Centre Society, London, 1978. Forces: voice, guitar, and piano. First performance at South Bank Centre, June 1978 with Norma Winstone (voice), Phil Lee (guitar), and Garrick (piano). Not commercially recorded; broadcast on BBC Radio 3.
- Hardy Country: suite for small or large ensemble, with or without vocal part; in nine self-contained movements, plus three poem settings for speaker. Commission from South-West Arts and Eldridge Pope, brewers, of Dorchester. First performance June 1990 in the Thomas Hardy Hall by jazz quartet with Norma Winstone. Later expanded for jazz orchestra. Selections of expanded version recorded in 1994.
- A Zodiac of Angels: suite of twelve pieces, depicting the situation and function of twelve heavenly beings as defined in A Dictionary of Angels by Gustav Davidson; selected and turned into verse by John Smith. Commission from Manchester Education Authority for symphony orchestra, six jazz instrumental soloists, jazz singer, chorus, and soloists. First performance at Royal Northern College of Music Opera Theatre, January 1988 in a fully staged (dance) version.
- The Royal Box: suite in nine movements based on phrases connected with royalty (e.g., "The Old Pretender", "The Royal Prerogative", "A Lady in Waiting", etc.). Inspired by the media treatment of the British Royal Family, in particular Prince Charles and Princess Diana. In two versions: piano/bass/drums trio and jazz orchestra. Trio version recorded complete; selections of jazz-orchestra version recorded.
- Bovingdon Poppies: oratorio of poem "Bovingdon Poppies" (a poem by Eva Travers), for chorus, soloists, jazz sextet, and string orchestra. First performance: Remembrance Day, November 1993.

== Autobiography ==
- Michael Garrick, Dusk Fire: Jazz in English Hands (with Trevor Bannister). Earley, Reading: Springdale Publishing, 2010. ISBN 978-0-9564353-0-9

== Other sources ==
- Coleridge Goode and Roger Cotterrell, Bass Lines: A Life in Jazz. London: Northway Publications, 2002.
- Duncan Heining. And Did Those Feet: Six British Jazz Composers, Jazz in Britain, 2023
- Alan Robertson, Joe Harriott: Fire in His Soul, 2nd edition. London: Northway Publications, 2011.
