= Joe Harriott =

Jamaican jazz musician and composer

- Born: Joseph Arthurlin Harriott; 15 July 1928; Kingston, Jamaica
- Died: 2 January 1973 (aged 44); Southampton, England
- Burial place: Bitterne, Southampton
- Occupations: Jazz musician and composer

Joseph Arthurlin Harriott (15 July 1928 – 2 January 1973) was a Jamaican jazz musician and composer, whose principal instrument was the alto saxophone. According to George McKay in Circular Breathing: The Cultural Politics of Jazz in Britain, Harriott was 'responsible for a series of brilliant experiments in new music in Britain through the 1960s'. His work was 'crucial' in two areas of innovation: free music and then global music fusion.

Initially a bebopper, he became a pioneer of free-form jazz. Born in Kingston, Harriott moved to the United Kingdom as a working musician in 1951 and lived in the country for the rest of his life. He was part of a wave of Caribbean jazz musicians who arrived in Britain during the 1950s, including Dizzy Reece, Harold McNair, Harry Beckett and Wilton Gaynair.

== Background ==
Born in Kingston, Jamaica, Harriott was educated at Alpha Boys School, an orphanage in the city. At Alpha he learned to play the clarinet, the instrument that was assigned to him shortly before his tenth birthday. He took up the baritone and tenor saxophone while performing with local dance bands, before settling on the alto saxophone. Harriott arrived in London in the summer of 1951, aged 23, as a member of Ossie Da Costa's band. British subjects did not require work permits or immigration visas at that time. When the band had completed their tour, Harriott decided to stay in London. He caught the attention of London's jazz scene while sitting in at the Feldman Club on Oxford Street on 26 August 1951.

Like the majority of alto players of his generation, he was deeply influenced by Charlie Parker. Harriott developed a style that fused Parker with his own Jamaican musical sensibility - most notably the mento and calypso music he grew up with. Even in his later experiments, Harriott's roots were always audible. However, it was his mastery of bebop that gained him immediate kudos within the British jazz scene upon his arrival in London.

== Career ==
During the 1950s, he had two long spells with drummer Tony Kinsey's band, punctuated by membership of Ronnie Scott's short-lived big band, occasional spells leading his own quartet and working in the quartets of drummers Phil Seamen and Allan Ganley. Harriott began recording under his own name in 1954, releasing a handful of EPs for Columbia, Pye/Nixa and Melodisc throughout the 1950s. However, the majority of his 1950s recordings were as a sideman with the musicians previously mentioned, also backing a diverse array of performers, from mainstream vocalist Lita Roza, to traditional trombonist George Chisholm, to the West African sounds of Buddy Pipp's Highlifers. Harriott also appeared alongside visiting American musicians during this period, including a "guest artist" slot on the Modern Jazz Quartet's 1959 UK tour. He formed his own quintet in 1958, and their style of hard-swinging bebop was noticed in the United States, leading to the release of the Southern Horizons and Free Form albums on the American Jazzland label.

On August 3, 1963, the Joe Harriott Quintet featuring Mike Falana was appearing at the Marquee in Oxford Street.

== Free-form innovator ==
By now firmly established as a bebop soloist, in 1960 Harriott turned to what he termed "abstract" or "free-form" music. He had some loose free-form ideas by the mid-1950s, but finally settled upon his conception in 1959, after a protracted spell in hospital with tuberculosis. At first he struggled to recruit other like-minded musicians to his vision. Indeed, two of his core band members, Harry South and Hank Shaw, left when these ideas surfaced. He finally settled on a line-up of Shake Keane (trumpet, flugelhorn), Pat Smythe (piano), Coleridge Goode (bass) and Phil Seamen (drums). Les Condon temporarily replaced Keane on trumpet in 1961, while Seamen left permanently the same year, his place taken by the return of the quintet's previous drummer, Bobby Orr. Frank Holder toured with Harriott and contributed to recording projects during this period.

Harriott's free-form music is often compared to Ornette Coleman's roughly contemporary breakthrough in the United States, but even cursory listening reveals deep divisions between their conceptions of "free jazz". In fact, there were several distinctive models of early free jazz, from Cecil Taylor to Sun Ra. Harriott's was another of these. His method demanded more complete group improvisation than displayed in Coleman's music, and often featured no particular soloist. Instead of the steady pulse of Ornette's drummer and bass player, Harriott's model demanded constant dialogue between musicians, which created an ever-shifting soundscape. Tempo, key and meter always free to alter in this music, and often did so. The presence of Bill Evans-inspired Scottish pianist Pat Smythe also gave the band a completely different texture to Coleman's, which had dispensed with the need for a pianist early on. Indeed, Smythe captured the radical potential of the band in 1960, with his observation that 'If it clashes, well, that's part of it'. Harriott's own playing style underwent some changes during this period, dispensing with orthodox bebop lines in favour of more angular, cut up phrasing. What remained however, was his lyricism, searing tone and sense of attack.

Harriott was always keen to communicate his ideas, be it on stage, in interviews or album liner notes. In 1962, he wrote in the liner notes for his Abstract album, "of the various components comprising jazz today - constant time signatures, a steady four-four tempo, themes and predictable harmonic variations, fixed division of the chorus by bar lines and so on, we aim to retain at least one in each piece. But we may well, if the mood seems to us to demand it, dispense with all the others".

He recorded three albums in this vein: Free Form (Jazzland, 1960), Abstract (Columbia (UK), 1962) and Movement (Columbia (UK), 1963). Abstract received a five-star review from Harvey Pekar in DownBeat, the first such honour for a British Jazz record. Free Form and Abstract together formed a perfect pair of cohesive, trailblazing free jazz sessions. The next album, Movement, featured some of his most fiercely abstract compositions, but these were tempered by some other, more straight-ahead pieces.

== Jazz fusions ==
Harriott's free-form compositions normally formed only a portion of live gigs. Indeed, the final album recorded by the quintet, 1964's High Spirits (Columbia), was a straight-ahead jazz interpretation of compositions from the musical of that name, which was based on the Noël Coward play Blithe Spirit. However, the continuing hostility of the older British jazz establishment to free form, and the drying up of recording and performance opportunities, saw Harriott's quintet cease to be sustainable in the changing musical climate of mid-1960s Britain. The quintet effectively broke up when Shake Keane moved to Germany in 1965. From this point onwards, Harriott worked freelance on a number of projects.

He made several albums and EPs with pianist/composer Michael Garrick in the mid-1960s, notably Promises, October Woman and Black Marigolds. The latter two were reissued by Dutton Vocalion on CD in 2005, and Garrick's Poetry and Jazz In Concert albums (which also featured Harriott) were released on CD by the same label in 2006. Another notable recording as a sideman was with the bluesman Sonny Boy Williamson II, on an April 1965 session that also featured Jimmy Page and Brian Auger.

During the late 1960s he and violinist John Mayer developed Indo-Jazz Fusion - an early attempt at building on music from diverse traditions. This involved a "double quintet" of five Indian and five jazz musicians playing together on a number of compositions largely conceived by Mayer. Opinion is divided on the success of these experiments. At their best, they offered a new and unique fusion of styles, but at times one can also detect a restriction on the freedom of the jazzmen to improvise. Three albums resulted from the collaboration with Mayer: Indo-Jazz Suite (Atlantic, 1966), Indo-Jazz Fusions Volumes I and II (Columbia (UK), 1967 and 1968).

Two other Harriott albums appeared in 1967 and 1968. The first, Swings High (Melodisc), was a strangely retrospective-sounding, but outstanding bebop record featuring old cohorts Seamen, Goode and Smythe; 1968's Personal Portrait (Columbia) was a mixed bag of jazz with strings and some affecting work with old bandmate Smythe and Stan Tracey.

In 1969, Harriott recorded the album Hum-Dono in collaboration with the Goan guitarist Amancio D'Silva. This was an unqualified success. Also featuring trumpeter Ian Carr and vocalist Norma Winstone, this album presented a more subtle and fluid mix of Harriott's signature alto sound, with D'Silva's unique Indo-bebop guitar style.

Also in 1969, Harriott made an appearance at Stan Tracey's Duke Ellington tribute concert, which was also released as the album We Love You Madly on Columbia. Harriott contributed a moving solo on "In a Sentimental Mood" that was captured for posterity by TV cameras, thus leaving the only existing footage of him in performance. He also made an important contribution to composer Laurie Johnson's 1970 LP, Synthesis (also Columbia).

== Last years ==
Harriott's work in 1969 was to be the last substantial performances of his career. While he continued to play around Britain wherever he was welcome, no further recording opportunities arose. He was virtually destitute in his last years, and ravaged by illness. He died of cancer on 2 January 1973, and is buried in Bitterne churchyard, in Southampton. On his gravestone, his own oft-quoted words provide his epitaph: "Parker? There's them over here can play a few aces too."

== Legacy ==
Since his death, Harriott's often overlooked contribution to the birth of free jazz has gradually been recognised. While he influenced important European free jazz pioneers such as John Stevens, Evan Parker and Albert Mangelsdorff, in the States his profile and influence was much smaller, despite the admiration of such figures as Charles Mingus. He also suffered mightily from lazy journalistic comparisons with Ornette Coleman, but more recently his originality has been recognised across the globe. American saxophonist Ken Vandermark's CD of Harriott free-form compositions, entitled Straight Lines, has introduced his music to another generation of free jazz fans. British players such as Courtney Pine, Gary Crosby and more recently Soweto Kinch have also acknowledged his influence and played his music on stage. An important biography by Alan Robertson, as well as the publication of Coleridge Goode's poignant reminiscences of him, have helped to make Harriott's story more widely known.

== Discography ==
Harriott's profile has also been helped by CD reissues of his most important albums, notably Free Form, Abstract, Movement and Hum-Dono, but other key albums have yet to be reissued. In recent years, other recordings of Harriott in his prime have surfaced. Michael Garrick has compiled and released a CD on his own Jazz Academy label, entitled Genius. This consists of some early 1960s live performances and home recordings made with a pianist friend, William Haig-Joyce. In 2006, a 1963 live recording made at a small club in Leicester was unearthed and issued on CD, entitled Live At Harry's. In early 2007, many of his hard-to-find mid-1950s sessions, both as leader and sideman, were made available on the 2-CD compilation Killer Joe.

A four-CD set entitled The Joe Harriott Story (Proper Box) was issued in 2011.

=== EPs as leader ===
- Cool Jazz With Joe (Melodisc UK, 1954)
- No Strings (Pye Nixa UK, 1956)
- Joe Harriott Quartet (Columbia UK, 1956)
- Joe Harriott With Strings (Jazz Today UK, 1956)
- Blue Harriott (Columbia UK, 1959)
- A Guy Called Joe (Columbia UK, 1960)

=== Albums as leader or co-leader ===
- Southern Horizons (Jazzland US, 1960)
- Free Form (Jazzland US, 1960)
- Abstract (Columbia UK & Capitol US, 1963)
- Movement (Columbia UK, 1963)
- High Spirits (Columbia UK, 1964)
- Indo-Jazz Suite - with John Mayer (Columbia UK & Atlantic US, 1966)
- Swings High (Melodisc UK, 1967)
- Indo-Jazz Fusions - with John Mayer (Columbia UK & Atlantic US, 1967)
- Indo-Jazz Fusions II - with John Mayer (Columbia UK, 1968)
- Personal Portrait (Columbia UK, 1968)
- Hum-Dono - with Amancio D'Silva (Columbia UK, 1969)
- Live at Harry's 1963 (Rare Music UK, 2006)

=== As sideman ===
- George Chisholm: Chis (Decca UK, 1956)
- Tony Kinsey: A "Jazz at the Flamingo" Session (Decca UK, 1957)
- Allan Ganley: Gone Ganley (Pye Nixa UK, 1957)
- Lita Roza: Listening in the After-Hours (Decca UK, 1957)
- Al Fairweather: Al's Pals (Columbia UK, 1959)
- Don Carlos: Crazy Latin (Columbia UK 1960)
- Shake Keane: In My Condition (Columbia UK 1961)
- Jeremy Robson: Blues For The Lonely (Columbia UK, 1962)
- Sonny Boy Williamson: Don't Send Me No Flowers (Marmalade UK, 1965 [1968], US: Springboard, 1972)
- Michael Garrick: Poetry & Jazz In Concert (Argo UK, 1965)
- Michael Garrick: Anthem/Wedding Hymn (Argo UK, 1965)
- Jeremy Robson: Before Night/Day (Argo UK, 1965)
- Michael Garrick: October Woman (Argo UK, 1965)
- Michael Garrick: Promises (Argo UK, 1966)
- Michael Garrick: Black Marigolds (Argo UK, 1966)
- The Nice: Five Bridges (Charisma UK, 1969)
- Stan Tracey Big Brass: We Love You Madly (Columbia UK, 1969)
- Laurie Johnson: Synthesis (Columbia UK, 1970)
