= Denis Preston =

British record producer, radio presenter and music critic

- Preston at work in Lansdowne Studios

Background information
- Also known as: Sidney Denis Preston
- Born: Sidney Denis Prechner; 16 November 1916; Stoke Newington, London, England
- Died: 21 October 1979 (aged 62) Hove, Sussex, England
- Genres: Jazz, skiffle, blues
- Occupations: Record producer, radio presenter, critic
- Years active: 1940-1970s
- Label: Lansdowne Records

Sidney Denis Preston (né Prechner, 16 November 1916 – 21 October 1979) was a British record producer, recording studio owner, radio presenter and music critic. He was particularly influential in the British jazz and associated skiffle scenes from the 1940s to the 1960s.

Preston worked independently; he was not contracted to a particular record label and would often risk cutting a record before pitching for a deal. He has been described as "Europe's first independent record producer", and as "probably the most important figure to emerge from the British jazz business". Neil Ardley described him as "a rare Diaghilev like figure" who steered many of the key figures of the British jazz scene into the studio when nobody else would record them.

== Biography ==
=== Early life ===
He was born Sidney Denis Prechner on 16 November 1916 in Stoke Newington, London, the son of Louis Prechner and Sarah née Hobsbaum. He changed his surname to Preston by deed poll in 1946. His cousin was the historian (and jazz critic) Eric Hobsbawm. Preston spent some of his childhood in Vienna and Brighton. His mother and father separated, leaving him and his sister to be raised solely by their mother. He soon became a passionate jazz fan, and cited his first encounter with live American jazz music - a UK appearance by Louis Armstrong in 1932 - as a major event in his life.

=== Career ===
Through his enthusiasm for jazz Denis Preston became friendly with the journalist Max Jones, and when Jones and Albert McCarthy set up the publication Jazz Music Preston became a contributor. This led to him compiling and presenting musical programmes for the BBC during the war. He became a regular presenter of shows on BBC Radio, including Radio Rhythm Club and later Radio Blackbirds, on which he championed black American jazz performers such as Duke Ellington.

After the end of the Second World War, in July 1945, he organised concerts featuring black musicians such as Freddy Grant, and also edited the influential Jazz Music magazine. e visited New York in 1948 for Decca Records, and while there heard Trinidadian musicians play calypso music. In January 1950, he supervised recordings made by calypso musicians Lord Kitchener and Lord Beginner at the Abbey Road Studios in London; the recordings were issued on the Parlophone label.

Inspired by the example of Norman Granz to set up as an independent producer, he supervised recordings issued on the independent Melodisc label, including Lord Kitchener's "London Is the Place for Me"; recordings by Roaring Lion; early recordings by Humphrey Lyttelton with Freddy Grant as the Grant-Lyttelton Paseo Jazz Band; and pianist Mike McKenzie. He also produced recordings by pianist George Shearing and blues musicians Big Bill Broonzy and Josh White. In 1952, he produced recordings in London by American singer Marie Bryant, including Sam Manning's risqué calypso "Don't Touch Me Tomato", for the Lyragon label, an offshoot of Polygon Records.

Preston continued to edit and occasionally present World of Jazz on BBC radio. He set up Lansdowne Productions in 1953. The following year, he also founded Record Supervision Ltd, a production company which licensed recordings to major labels. In 1955, he accepted a licensing deal with Pye Records and produced records for Chris Barber, Acker Bilk, Alex Welsh, Frank Holder, Sandy Brown and Al Fairweather, Terry Lightfoot, and Kenny Baker. He also produced some of Lonnie Donegan's early skiffle recordings, including "Rock Island Line", recorded in July 1954 and first released on Chris Barber's album New Orleans Joys in January 1955 before becoming a top ten hit in the UK later that year.

== Studio founder ==
In 1956, he established Lansdowne Studios (and associated label Lansdowne Records) in Holland Park, west London. The same year he produced Humphrey Lyttelton's record "Bad Penny Blues" with the recording engineer Joe Meek. When Meek left Lansdowne in 1960, he took inspiration from Preston's independent approach and expanded on this by also producing in his own recording studio.

In 1958, immediately after the Notting Hill race riots, Preston was active in the anti-racism movement. With musician and critic Fred Dallas, and musicians Johnny Dankworth, Cleo Laine, Winifred Atwell, George Melly and others, he helped set up the Stars Campaign for Interracial Friendship (SCIF). The organisation linked with activist Claudia Jones to arrange several events and clubs in the area on a non-racial and anti-fascist basis.

During the early 1960s, Preston worked with EMI on their Columbia label. He produced Acker Bilk's international hit "Stranger on the Shore" in 1961. Preston was quoted in 1963: "I was a great admirer of those involved in traditional jazz. It was very alive and active. Colyer and Barber seemed to be ploughing a lonely furrow, united against the world.... But with every successive would-be hit, another spark has died."

Preston's production branched out from traditional jazz into folk, modern jazz and guitar-based genres, working with artists such as Jack Elliot, Roger Whittaker, Wout Steenhuis, Shawn Phillips, Joe Harriott and Stan Tracey, as well as African and Indian-inspired artists Amancio D'Silva and Kofi Ghanaba. Among his jazz production successes were Stan Tracey's "Under Milk Wood" Suite, and the Indo-Jazz Fusions albums by John Mayer and Joe Harriott. He put together the Lansdowne String Quartet, which recorded John Mayer's Shanta Quintet with jazz sitar player Diwan Motihar, and accompanied saxophonist Tony Coe on Tony's Basement (1967).

== Death ==
Preston died in Hove, Sussex, in 1979. His Sunday Times obituary described him as "probably the most important figure to emerge from the British jazz business".
