= Shake Keane =

Vincentian jazz musician and poet (1927–1997)

- Born: Ellsworth McGranahan Keane; 30 May 1927; Kingstown, St Vincent, West Indies
- Died: 11 November 1997 (aged 70); Bergen, Norway
- Education: University of London
- Occupations: Musician and poet
- Notable work: One a Week with Water (1979)
- Awards: Casa de las Américas Prize

The Angel Horn by Shake Keane, with an illustration of the poet's face on the book cover, published by House of Nehesi Publishers

Ellsworth McGranahan "Shake" Keane (30 May 1927 – 11 November 1997) was a Vincentian jazz musician and poet. He is best known today for his role as a jazz trumpeter, principally his work as a member of the ground-breaking Joe Harriott Quintet (1959–65).

== Early life in St Vincent ==
Born on the Caribbean island of St Vincent into "a humble family that loved books and music", Keane attended Kingstown Methodist School and St Vincent Grammar School. He was taught to play the trumpet by his father, Charles (who died when Keane was 13), and gave his first public recital at the age of six. When he was 14 years old, Keane led a musical band made up of his brothers. In the 1940s, with his mother Dorcas working to raise six children, the teenager joined one of the island's leading bands, Ted Lawrence and His Silvertone Orchestra.

During Keane's early adulthood in St Vincent, his principal interest was literature, rather than the music for which he would become better known. He had been dubbed "Shakespeare" by his school friends, on account of his love of prose and poetry. This nickname was subsequently shortened to "Shake", which name he came to use throughout his adult life. He published two books of poetry – L'Oubili (1950) and Ixion (1952) – while still in St Vincent.

== Early career in Europe ==
Keane emigrated to Great Britain in 1952. He worked on BBC Radio's Caribbean Voices programme, reading poetry and interviewing fellow writers and musicians. He began reading literature at London University by day, while also playing the trumpet in London nightclubs, working in a number of styles including cabaret, highlife, soca, mento, calypso and jazz. From 1959, he committed more fully to jazz, spending six years as a member of pioneering alto saxophonist Joe Harriott's band. Harriott's group was the first in Europe, and one of the first worldwide, to play free jazz, and Keane contributed mightily to the band's artistic success, thanks to his fleet and powerful improvisatory skills on trumpet and flugelhorn. Both Harriott and Keane played with the Mike McKenzie Harlem All Stars.

During this period, Keane and Harriott also played extensively with English jazz pianist Michael Garrick, often in a "poetry and jazz" setting. He also made a small handful of records under his own name, but these were usually light jazz, a world away from his work with Harriott and Garrick. In 1966, Keane left Britain to settle in Germany. He became featured soloist with the Kurt Edelhagen Radio Orchestra, and also joined the pre-eminent European jazz ensemble of the 1960s, The Kenny Clarke-Francy Boland Big Band.

== Family life in London ==
During 1953, Keane met Christiane Richard, from Lyon, France, at one of his performances in London. The couple settled down together in Tufnell Park and had two sons in the early 1960s: Alan and Noel Julian. They moved to Notting Hill to live with his friend and bandmate, Coleridge Goode. At some point, Keane formed a relationship with Scots-born Elizabeth Uma Ramanan, with whom he had a son, Roland Ramanan, in 1966, by which time Keane had left for Germany to join Edelhagen's orchestra.

== Later career ==
Keane's musical career was set aside in the early 1970s, as he returned to St Vincent in 1972 to take up a government position as director of culture, remaining in the post until 1975. Afterwards, he turned to teaching as his main profession, while continuing to write poetry. His collection One a Week with Water (1979) won the prestigious Cuban Casa de las Américas prize for poetry.

In 1981, Keane moved to New York City, settling the Bedford-Stuyvesant section of Brooklyn. He did not return full-time to music until 1989, when he rejoined Michael Garrick and his old band mates Coleridge Goode and Bobby Orr for a tour in honour of Joe Harriott. In 1991, Keane appeared in a BBC Arena documentary with the Jamaican poet Linton Kwesi Johnson, filmed by Anthony Wall.

== Death and legacy ==
In the 1990s, Keane remained based in Brooklyn. He had reestablished contact with Margaret Bynoe, an academic who also hailed from St Vincent. They married and set up home together in 1991. Thanks to an old friend and colleague from the BBC in the 1950s, Erik Bye, Keane established a regular pattern of work in Norway from 1991 to his death. He contributed music to Norwegian television and stage productions for the next few years, also touring the country playing jazz. It was while preparing for one such tour that he became ill, subsequently dying from stomach cancer on 11 November 1997 in Bergen, at the age of 70.

In 2003, he was honoured by his country with the unveiling of a life-size bust at the Peace Memorial Hall in Kingstown.

The authoritative collection to date of Shake Keane's poetry is The Angel Horn – Shake Keane (1927–1997) Collected Poems, published by House of Nehesi Publishers in 2005 and launched that same year at the St. Martin Book Fair to an audience of more than 200 guests. Keane himself had selected the poems for inclusion but died before publication. The book was seen through to publication by his widow, Margaret Bynoe. According to Vincentian author Dr. Adrian Fraser, "The Angel Horn is vintage Shake Keane, … spanning a period of 40 years … the best of Keane."

The biography Riff: The Shake Keane Story, by Philip Nanton, was published in January 2021 by Papillote Press.

== Discography ==
=== As bandleader ===
- In My Condition (Columbia, 1961)
- Bossa Negra (Columbia, 1962)
- That's The Noise (Decca, 1965)
- With The Keating Sound (Decca, 1966)
- The Big Fat Horn Of Shake Keane (Decca, 1966)
- Dig It (Phase 4, 1968)
- Rising Stars At Evening Time (Economy, 1971)
- Real Keen Reggae into Jazz (LKJ, 1991)

=== As sideman ===
- Joe Harriott: Southern Horizons (Jazzland, 1960)
- Joe Harriott: Free Form (Jazzland, 1960)
- Wilton "Bogey" Gaynair: Africa Calling (Candid, 1960)
- Joe Harriott: Abstract (Columbia, 1962)
- Joe Harriott: Movement (Columbia, 1963)
- Joe Harriott: High Spirits (Columbia, 1964)
- David Mack: New Directions (Columbia, 1964)
- Michael Garrick: Poetry & Jazz In Concert (Argo, 1964)
- Michael Garrick: October Woman (Argo, 1965)
- Jonny Teupen: Love and Harp A La Latin (Vogue, 1965; reissued by Sonorama Records, Berlin, Germany. Listed as Leonard Blech, a pseudonym for a well known West Indian trumpet player who worked at the BBC and in the combos of Joe Harriot, Jonny Keating and Bob Jarnon)
- Ambrose Campbell: High-Life Today (Columbia, 1966)
- Joe Harriott and John Mayer: Indo Jazz Fusions (Columbia, 1967)
- Kenny Clarke/Francy Boland Big Band: Swing, Waltz, Swing (Philips, 1966), Sax No End (SABA, 1967), Out of the Folk Bag (Columbia, 1967), 17 Men and Their Music (Campi, 1967), Latin Kaleidoscope (MPS, 1968)

== Poetry collections ==
- L'Oubili (1950)
- Ixion (1952)
- One a Week with Water (1979)
- The Volcano Suite (1979)
- Palm and Octopus (1994)
- The Angel Horn – Shake Keane (1927–1997) Collected Poems (2005)
- Ixion & The Soufrière Suite (2025)
