= Sandy Brown (musician) =

Scottish musician (1929–1975)

- Born: Alexander Brown; 25 February 1929; Izatnagar, Uttar Pradesh, India
- Died: 15 March 1975 (aged 46) Hampstead, London, England
- Genres: Jazz
- Occupations: Musician; Acoustic engineer Composer
- Instrument: Clarinet
- Years active: 1949–1975
- Website: sandybrownjazz.co.uk

Alexander Brown (25 February 1929 – 15 March 1975) was a Scottish jazz clarinetist, band leader, and acoustic engineer, who performed mostly New Orleans-style and mainstream jazz. He had a particular interest in African music, which was reflected in his compositions.

== Biography ==
Brown was born of Scottish parents in Izatnagar, Uttar Pradesh, India, where his father was a railway engineer. In the early 1930s, the family relocated to Edinburgh, Scotland, where Brown was later educated at the Royal High School. He taught himself clarinet from the age of twelve. After national service he studied architecture at Edinburgh College of Art. While there, in 1949, he also started a band with his old schoolfriend Al Fairweather. The two achieved national recognition following a concert at the Usher Hall, Edinburgh, in February 1952.

In 1953, the band travelled south and played among other places at the newly built Royal Festival Hall in London. Brown returned to finish his studies in Edinburgh, but Fairweather decided to stay in London.

On completing his studies, Brown obtained a position as an acoustic engineer with the BBC and moved to London, where he reformed his band. In 1957, he collaborated with Al Fairweather in recording the landmark album McJazz, hailed by critic Steve Race as being one of his top dozen jazz recordings of all time. In 1974, he travelled to New York and recorded with members of Count Basie's band. Other artists whom Brown played with during his career included George Chisholm, Kenny Wheeler, Henry "Red" Allen, Diz Disley, Humphrey Lyttelton, Earle Warren, Eddie Durham, Sammy Price and Pee Wee Russell.

In his last months he took an exhausting trip to Africa on architectural business. Soon after, while watching England beating Scotland at rugby on television, a glass of whisky in his hand, he died at home of a heart attack brought about by malignant hypertension, aged just 46. He lived in West Hampstead, London.

A collection of his writings, The McJazz Manuscripts, was published by Faber & Faber in 1979. He formed two professional practices: Sandy Brown Associates, architects and acoustic engineers, and Sandy Brown MSU, building services engineers.
