= John Mayer (composer) =

Indian composer and musician

John Mayer

John Henry Basil Mayer (28 October 1930 – 9 March 2004) was an Indian composer known primarily for his fusions of jazz with Indian music in the British-based group Indo-Jazz Fusions with the Jamaican-born saxophonist Joe Harriott.

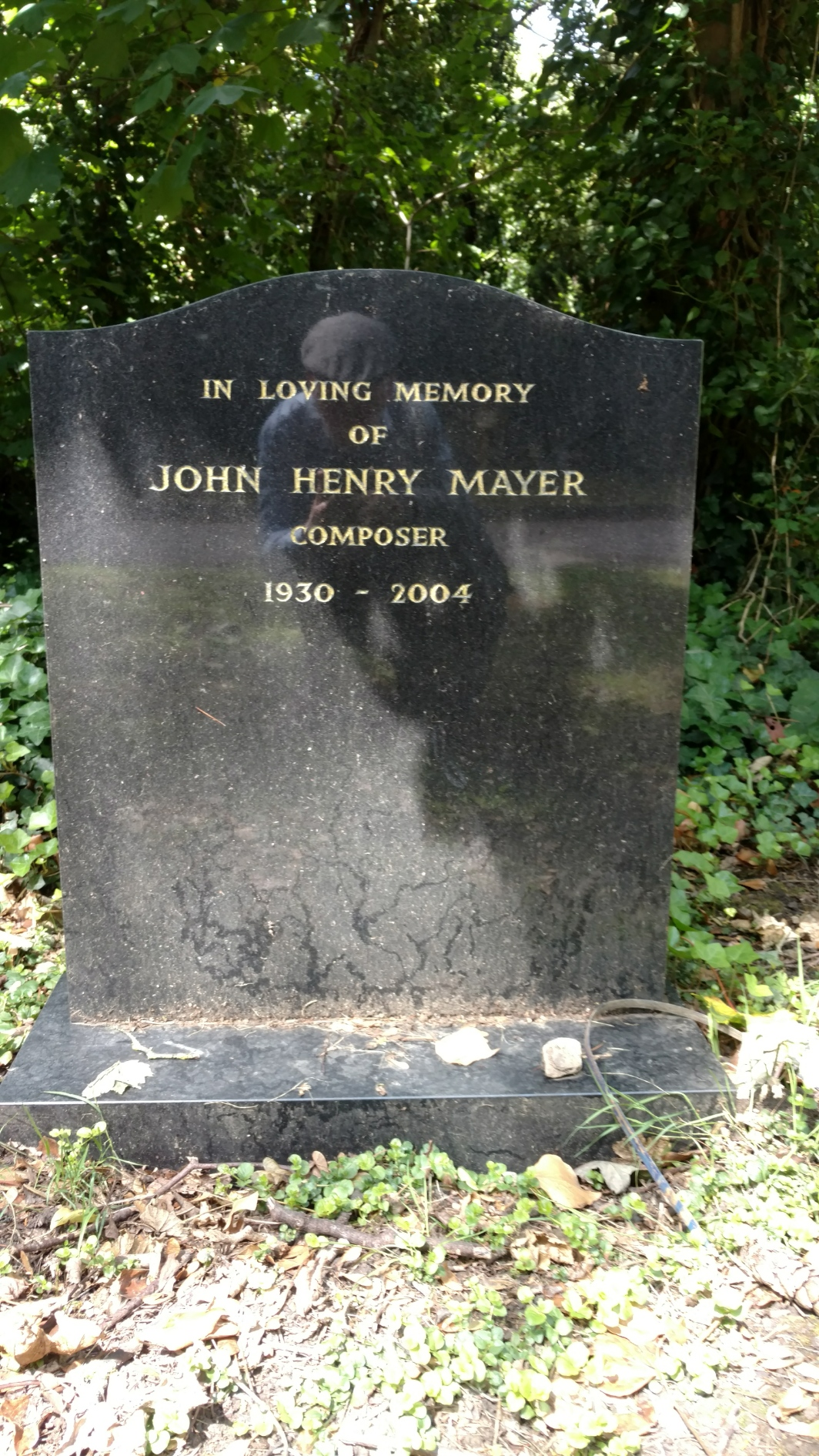
Gravestone in St Pancras and Islington Cemetery

Mayer was born in Calcutta, Bengal, British India, to an Anglo-Indian father and Tamil mother. After studying with Phillipe Sandre in Calcutta and Melhi Mehta in Bombay, he won a scholarship to London's Royal Academy of Music in 1952, where he studied composition with Matyas Seiber, as well as comparative music and religion in eastern and western cultures.

He worked as a violinist with the London Philharmonic Orchestra (1953–58) and then with the Royal Philharmonic Orchestra (1958–65), but was also composing fusions of Hindustani classical and Western classical forms fused with jazz undertones from 1952 onwards. His Violin Sonata was performed by Yehudi Menuhin in 1955. His Shanta Quintet was recorded by jazz sitar player Diwan Motihar and Denis Preston's Lansdowne String Quartet in 1967.

In the 1960s he worked extensively with the Jamaican-born jazz musician Joe Harriott, with whom he formed the group Indo-Jazz Fusions, a ten-piece featuring a jazz quintet and five Indian musicians. The new incarnation of the band, called John Mayer's Indo Jazz Fusions, was revived in the 1990s by his students Richard Dray, Will Joss, and Simon Gray, then led by Mayer himself, and continued to play live gigs—featuring his son Jonathan Mayer on sitar—until John's death.

His film scores included the music to Herostratus (1967) and Danger Route (1967). The Joe Harriott-John Mayer Double Quintet composed the distinctive theme tune, "Acka Raga", for the early episodes of the BBC quiz show Ask the Family, which was broadcast between 1967 and 1984. The theme featured Mayer on sitar.

From 1989 onwards, Mayer, who lived in north London, taught composition at Birmingham Conservatoire where he introduced the BMus Indian music course in 1997. He continued to compose concert works (chamber, solo and orchestral) and to record jazz-fusion albums.

In March 2004, Mayer was hit by a motorist in North London and fatally injured. He had two daughters (Lesli and Toni) with his first wife Sheila, and two sons (Jahan and Jonathan) with his second wife Gillian. Jonathan Mayer is also a sitar player and composer. A biography by John O. Robison was published in 2019.

== Selected works ==
- Raga Music For Solo Clarinet (1952, released by Chantry, 1978)
- Violin Sonata (1955)
- Dances Of India for sitar, tabla, tanpura, flute and orchestra (1958)
- Nine for Bacon (1965)
- Violin Concerto No 1 (1975)
- Concerto for the Instruments of an Orchestra (1976)

=== Recordings ===
- Indo-Jazz Suite (Columbia UK, and Atlantic in US, 1965)
- Indo-Jazz Fusions, The Mayer-Harriott Double Quintet (Columbia UK, and Atlantic in US, 1967)
- Shanta Quintet for sitar and strings (Columbia UK, 1967)
- Indo-Jazz Fusions II (Columbia UK, 1968)
- Etudes (Sonet, 1969 recordings, re-released 2009)
- Dhammapada (1976, EMI LP only released in 2006)
- Violin Concerto No. 2, Sarangi ka Sangit (1978, released: First Hand, 2020)
- Flute Concerto (RCA Red Seal 1982, for James Galway)
- Shivanatarai for orchestra, LSO commission (1982)
- Six Ragamalas for cello and tampura (first broadcast 1982)
- Oboe Concerto Shahnai-Awaz (broadcast 1983)
- Sangit alamkara for piano duet (first broadcast 1991)
- Asian Airs (1996, Nimbus CD)
- String Quartet No 2 Nava Rasa (first broadcast 1989)
- Ragatel (1998, Nimbus CD)
- Inja (2000, First Hand Records CD)
- Shiva Nataraj (2002, FHR CD)
