= 50 Carnaby Street =

Building in London, England

Coordinates: 51.512543°N 0.138580°W

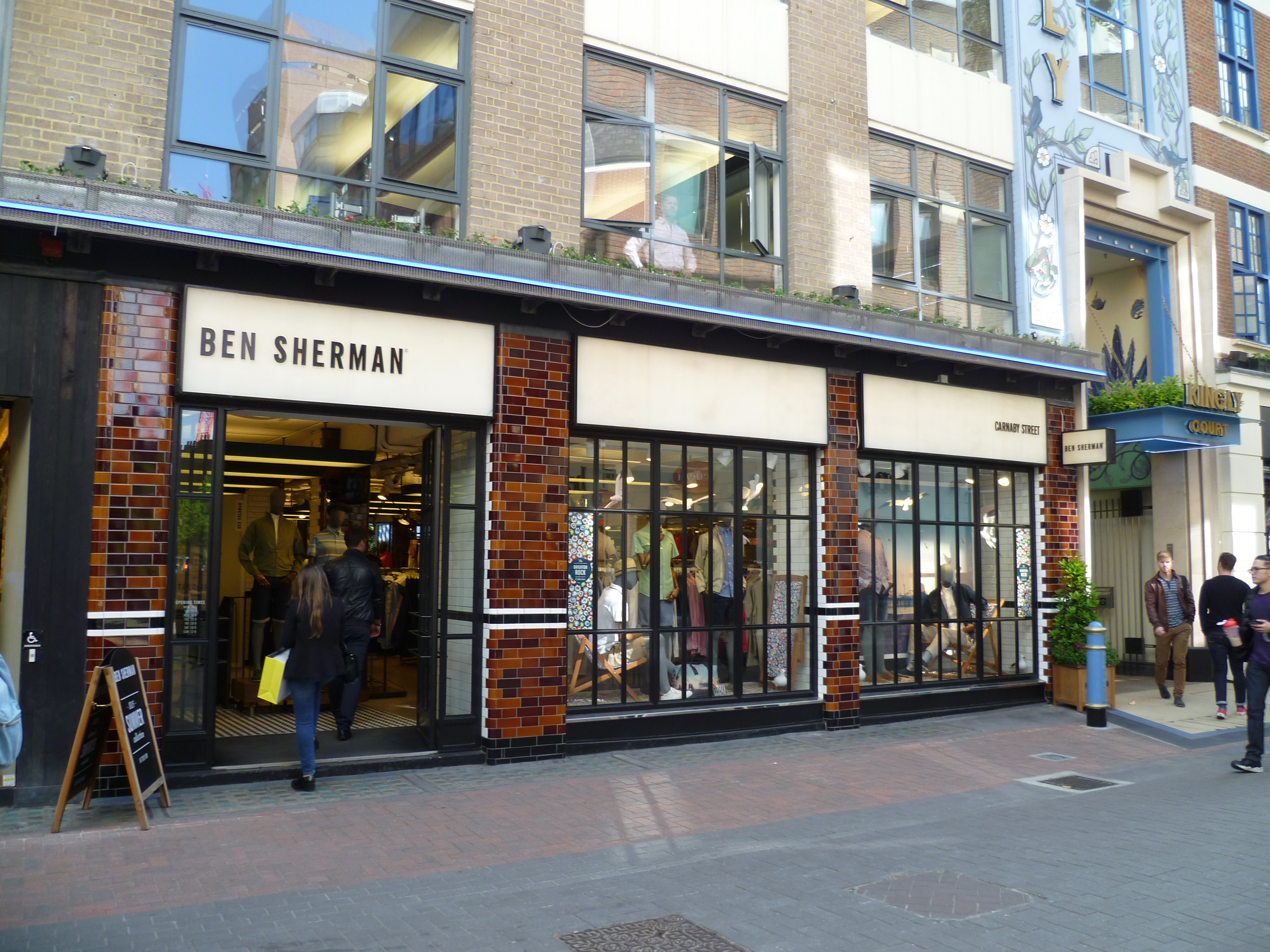
50 Carnaby Street, 2015

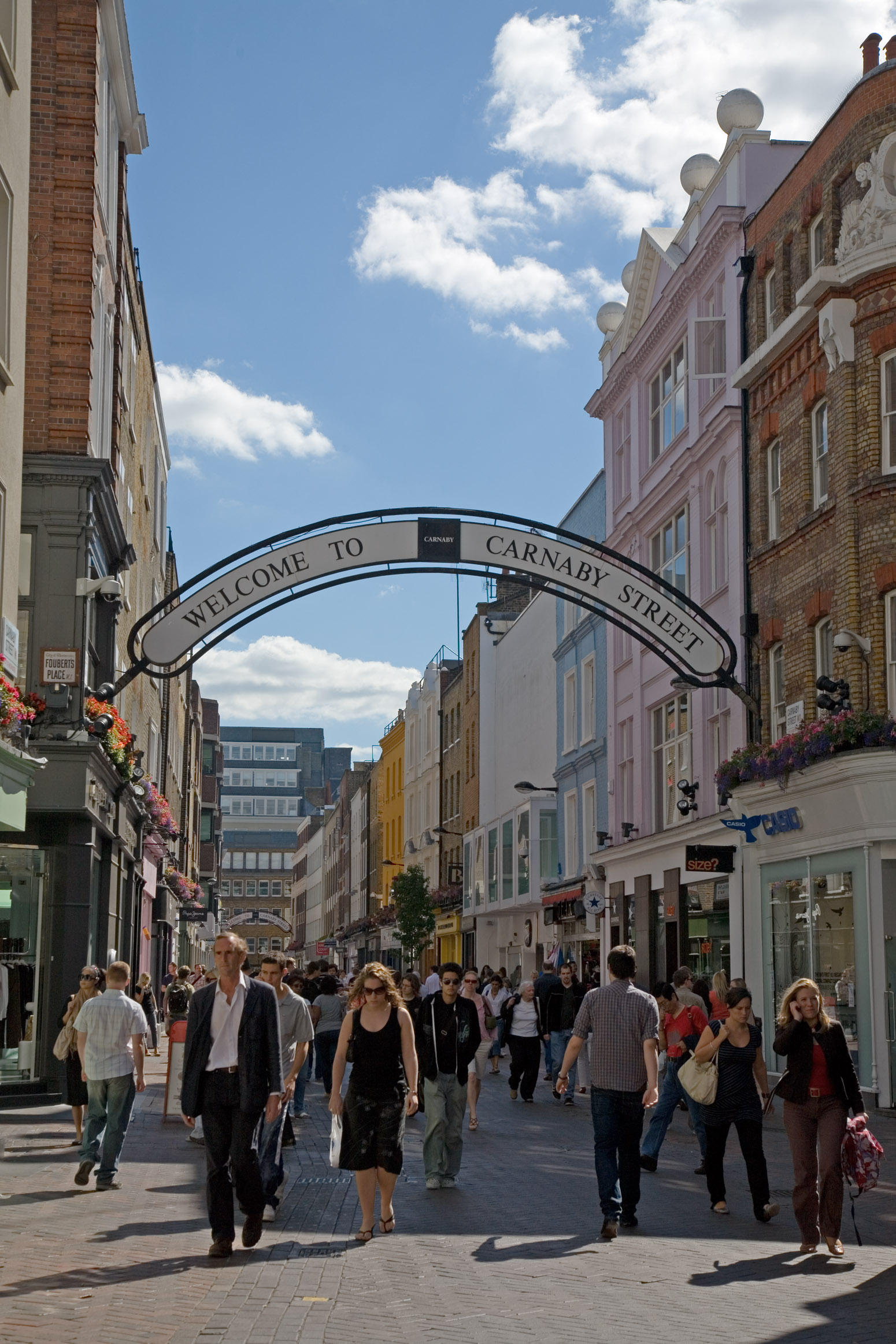
Carnaby Street is now a tourist destination

50 Carnaby Street in London's Soho district was the site of several important music clubs in the 20th century. These clubs were often run for and by the black community, with jazz and calypso music predominating in the earlier years. From 1936, it was the Florence Mills Social Parlour. In the 1940s it was the Blue Lagoon Club. In 1950, it was briefly Club Eleven, and from the early 1950s it was the Sunset Club. From 1961, it was occupied by the Roaring Twenties nightclub. In the 1970s it was Columbo's. It is now a Ben Sherman shop.

== Florence Mills Social Parlour ==
From 1936 it was the location of the Florence Mills Social Parlour, named after the black actress Florence Mills and run by Amy Ashwood, first wife of Marcus Garvey.

Garvey started the venture with Sam Manning, a pioneering black recording artist and calypso singer from Trinidad, and it was part restaurant, part social centre and part jazz club, and a location where black intellectuals and anyone interested in Pan-Africanism could meet. Visitors included the historian C.L.R. James, the Trinidadian journalist George Padmore, the future president of Kenya Jomo Kenyatta, the Guyanese Pan-Africanist T. Ras Makonnen and the Ghanaian politician J.B. Danquah.

== Blue Lagoon Club ==
In the 1940s it was the Blue Lagoon Club, supposedly a front for prostitution. In November 1946, Margaret Cook was shot dead outside the club and it was said that guns had to be handed in at the door with coats. The police investigation into the murder of blonde Mrs Cook was hampered by the discovery that she had several different names. Also in 1946, Mrs Violet Boofty was found gassed in her flat the night after her birthday party at the Blue Lagoon. The Inquest found that there was no evidence that she had been assaulted by a man at the club as had been reported.

== Club Eleven ==
Club Eleven were resident for six months in 1950 until they were closed by a police raid. It then became the calypso Sunset Club.

Club Eleven had been founded at 44 Great Windmill Street in 1948 as a co-operative to promote bebop jazz. It was named after the eleven founders who included business manager Harry Morris along with ten British bebop players: Lennie Bush, Leon Calvert, Tony Crombie, Bernie Fenton (1921-2001, piano), Laurie Morgan (1926-2020, drums), Joe Mudele, Johnny Rogers (1926-2016, saxophone), Tommy Pollard, piano and vibes), Ronnie Scott, and Hank Shaw. Scott and John Dankworth were group leaders.

Tony Hall writing in 1960 said, "I can never recall such a sense of evil excitement in a club. The atmosphere was so vivid that the red glow from the stand and the savage beat made me think of hell on earth!" The club was raided by the Drugs Squad on the evening of 15 April 1950. Denis Rose was arrested by the Royal Military Police for desertion from the Army. Six of the musicians were arrested and appeared in court on drugs charges. The club closed soon after.

== Sunset Club ==
From the early 1950s it was the Sunset Club, a racially mixed club where jazz was played until seven in the morning. American GIs were regular customers, as they were in many London clubs in the 1940s and 50s. Caribbean music became more important in the club and the Russ Henderson Steel Band, the first steel band in Britain, formed late 1952, played their first gig there. The influential Trinidadian musician Rupert Nurse was a bandleader at the club from 1954. According to Duke Vin (Vincent Forbes), by 1959 the Sunset Club was one of the five main Caribbean music clubs in London, the others being the Contemporanean in Mayfair, club 59, Flamingo and Club 77. The proprietor of the club, Gustavus Alexander Leslie, filed for bankruptcy in December 1959.

== Roaring Twenties ==
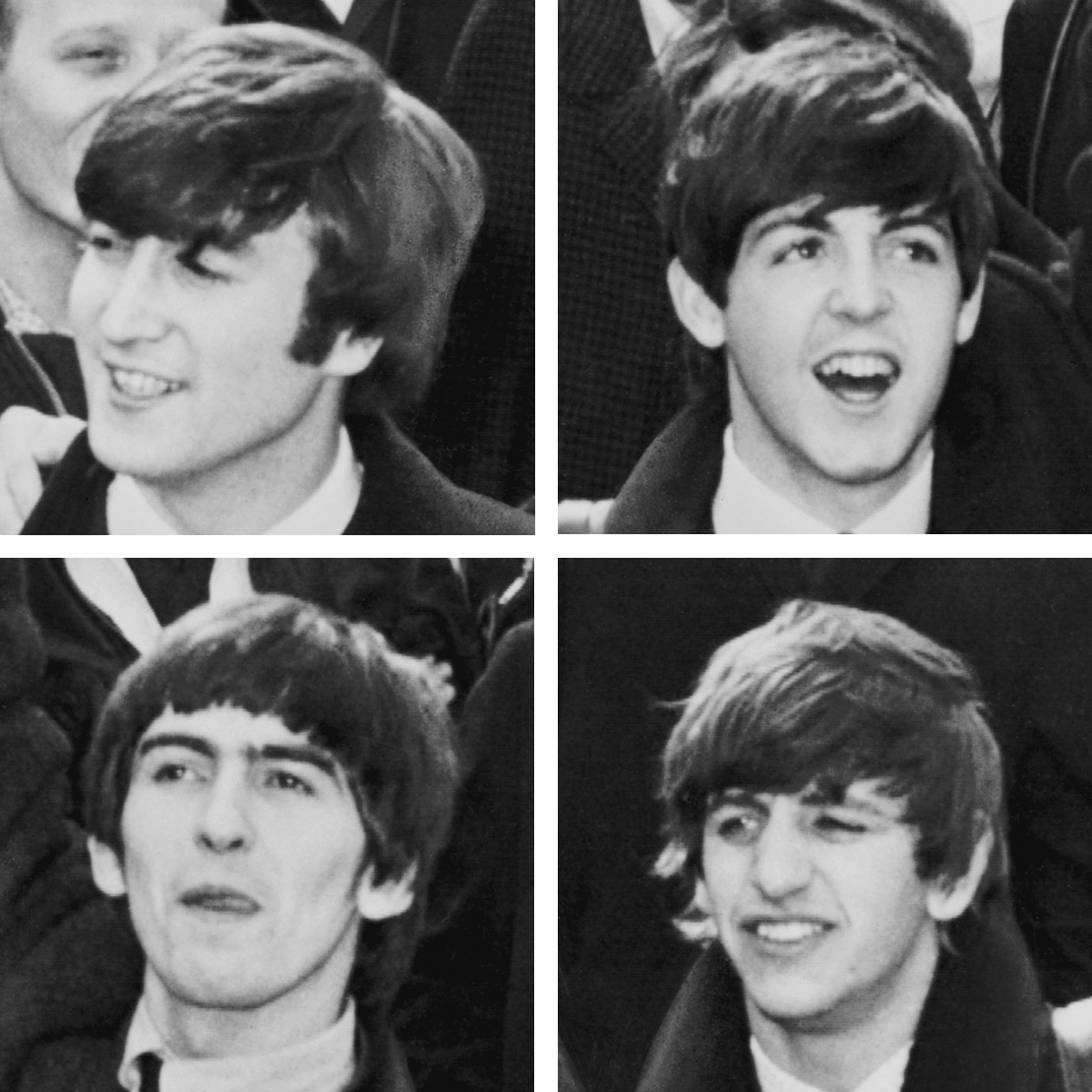
The Beatles played at the Roaring Twenties

The Roaring Twenties opened on 4 July 1962, Count Suckle (Wilbert Augustus Campbell) was the first DJ at the club and also the bouncer. Suckle claimed in 1974 that "the club wasn't opened for black people, it was owned by Jewish people and it only catered for Jewish kids. I was the only black guy there because I was the leading DJ at the time and they wanted a popular 'front' figure to pull in the crowds so I was hired". Suckle complained: "There weren't any black owned clubs then. The places in the West End where black kids used to go were white owned. Some of them used black staff as a 'front' like the Colombo does now". After his followers began to demand admittance, however, the management was forced to change its "whites only" admittance policy and soon it was a mainly black club.

Drug use was common in the club. Count Suckle recalled, "I left the Twenties because it was rough ... it was just a dump. It was a drugs scene, dope pushing, young kids smoking dope, people fighting, the police raiding the club, hundreds of young black kids taken to jail y`know! I just couldn`t stand it." One former Mod remembers a less oppressive atmosphere with a few white Ska-lovers being admitted who saw perfunctory police raids during which small amounts of drugs were dropped on the floor then picked up again when the police had gone with nobody being searched or arrested.

Initially the music was a combination of R & B, soul, and bluebeat/ska. Later, the Beatles, the Rolling Stones and Georgie Fame played there. Other early 1960s visitors included British R&B pioneers Cyril Davies All Stars, the Who and the Animals. Later in the 1960s, Lloyd Coxsone the sound system operator performed. Every Sunday was fashion night when everyone was expected to wear a suit and tie. The doorman was Charles (Charlie) Brown, the boxer and Jamaican landlord of murderer John Christie at 10 Rillington Place. Malcolm McLaren thought the name was a reference to the U.S. television show The Roaring '20s which was popular in Britain at the time.

== Columbo's ==
In the late 1970s the name changed to Columbo's. Lloyd Coxsone continued and was joined by Denzil Exodus. Bob Marley played in 1975 and the club featured an autographed picture of Peter Falk as the TV detective "Columbo" on its walls. The club was mentioned in the NME Guide to Rock & Roll London in 1978 and is thought to have closed in the early 1980s.

== Today ==
As of July 2014 it is a Ben Sherman shop.

== See also ==
- Carnaby Street
