= Ronnie Chamberlain =

British jazz musician (1924–1999)

Ronald H. Chamberlain (12 May 1924 – 17 September 1999) was a British jazz clarinettist and saxophonist, best known for his long stints with bands led by Vic Lewis and Ted Heath, appearing on several of their respective recordings.

In March 1945, he recorded with three different line-ups of Carlo Krahmer’s Chicagoans, including Johnny Best, Stephane Grappelli, Vic Lewis (g), Tommy Bromley (b), Lad Busby (tb), Aubrey Frank (ts) Gerry Moore (p), Don Jacoby (tp), Harry Roche (tb), Derek Hawkins (cl), Sam Donahue (ts), Rocky Collucio (p), and Bert Howard (b).

Chamberlain was an early member of the Jive Bombers. He also recorded with four different line-ups of the Melody Maker All-Stars (1951, 1952, 1954 & 1955) coinciding with, variously, many of the major names in British jazz, including Kenny Baker (tp), Gordon Langhorn (tb), Henry McKenzie (cl), Ronnie Scott (ts), Johnny Dankworth (as), Dave Shand (bs), Victor Feldman (vib), Ralph Sharon (p), Ivor Mairants (g), Charlie Short (b), Jack Parnell (d), Jackie Armstrong (tb), Vic Ash (cl), Les Gilbert (as), Martin Slavin (vib), Bill McGuffie (p), Johnny Hawksworth (b), Don Lusher (tb), Harry Klein (bs), Tito Burns (acc), Eric Delaney (d), Keith Christie (tb), Tommy Whittle (ts), Bert Weedon (g), Joe Mudele (b), and Joe Harriott (as).
