= Tommy Pollard =

British jazz pianist and vibraphone player (1923–1960)

Tommy Pollard (1923 – 8 October 1960) was an English jazz musician, a pianist, accordion and vibes player, one of the founding members of Club Eleven, and influential in the early days of British bebop.

Pollard learned piano and accordion while a teenager, then added vibraphone. He worked with many bandleaders from the late 1930s and early 1940s, including Tito Burns, Johnny Claes, the Jack Hamilton/Roy Marsh Sextet, Derek Neville and (early in 1942) Harry Parry. Later in 1942 he joined the military, playing for Ralph Reader’s Gang Show around the world. After the war he played with Ray Ellington, with Buddy Featherstonhaugh and (on the ocean liner Queen Mary) with Bobby Kevin's Band. While in New York he heard Charlie Parker perform live, a lasting influence. Back in the UK he worked with Tito Burns, Cab Kaye, Ronnie Scott and Victor Feldman.

In 1948 Pollard was one of the eleven founders of Club Eleven in Soho, along with other British bebop players: Lennie Bush, Leon Calvert, Tony Crombie, Bernie Fenton (1921-2001, piano), Laurie Morgan (1926-2020, drums), Joe Mudele, Johnny Rogers (1926-2016, saxophone), Ronnie Scott, and Hank Shaw. John Dankworth led one of the house bands and Ronnie Scott the other. Pollard played in Scott's band. In 1950 the club changed venue from Windmill Street to Carnaby Street, but was closed down in April 1950 following a police raid.

Tommy Pollard's Downbeat Five - Spike Robinson (alto sax), Pollard (piano), Victor Feldman (vibes), Lennie Bush (bass) and Tony Crombie (drums) - recorded together in 1951. Pollard toured the Netherlands, then rejoined Tony Crombie, Ronnie Scott, Joe Mudele and others in the early 1950s. But, badly affected by drug addiction, his health gave way in the mid 1950s, and after that he performed very infrequently. He died in 1960 at the age of 37.

== Recordings ==
- Johnny Claes and his Claepigeons (Columbia, 1941, piano)
- Harry Parry's Radio Rhythm Club Sextet (Parlophone, 1941-42, piano)
- Harry Hayes and his Orchestra (HMV, 1947, piano)
- Alan Dean and the All Star Sextet (Esquire, 1948-49, vibraphone)
- Keith Bird and The Esquire Six (Esquire, 1949, vibraphone)
- Tommy Pollard's Downbeat Five (Esquire, 1951, piano)
- Vic Feldman Modern Jazz Quartet (Esquire, 1954-55, piano)
- Vic Feldman, Suite Sixteen (Contemporary, 1958)
