= Joe Mudele =

British jazz double bass player (1920–2014)

Joseph C Mudele (30 September 1920 – 7 March 2014), known as Joe Mudele and sometimes as Joe Muddel or Muddell), was a British jazz double bass player, one of the Club Eleven collective, where he first played with John Dankworth.

== Early career ==
Mudele grew up in Downham, South East London. He left school at the age of 14 and began singing and playing in local bands, but only began playing double bass at the age of 17 after buying an upright bass in a junk shop. During the war he served in the Royal Air Force. After the war he studied for a while with James Merritt, principal double bassist with the Philharmonia Orchestra, while resuming an earlier career as a roofer. His professional playing career took off in 1947 with the likes of clarinetist Carl Barriteau, accordionist Tito Burns and with the Jimmy Macaffer Band. He toured with visiting American pianist Hoagy Carmichael during the autumn of 1948. Attending the 1949 International Jazz Festival in Paris, Mudele was invited to sit in with Charlie Parker (on his European debut) and his drummer Max Roach.

== Club Eleven and after ==
In 1948 Mudele became a founder member of Club Eleven, a Soho nightclub open between 1948 and 1950 which played a significant role in the emergence of the bebop jazz movement in Britain. The club was so named because it was a musicians cooperative with 11 founders – business manager Harry Morris along with ten British bebop players, including Mudele: the others were Lennie Bush, Leon Calvert, Tony Crombie, Bernie Fenton (1921-2001, piano), Laurie Morgan (1926-2020, drums), Johnny Rogers (1926-2016, saxophone), Tommy Pollard (1923-1960, piano and vibes), Ronnie Scott, and Hank Shaw. John Dankworth was also involved, heading up one of two house bands with Mudele on bass.

After the club was closed Mudele became a founder member of the John Dankworth Seven, while also continuing to play with others, including Ambrose, Jack Nathan, the Norman Burns Quintet and Kenny Baker's Quartet. He formed his own band, Blue Room, for a year (1952-3, including the Jamaican saxophonist Joe Harriott), was a member of the house band of the Coconut Grove nightclub in Regent Street, then stayed for an extended period with the Tommy Whittle Quintet (from 1954) and later the Tony Kinsey Quartet. During this period Mudele also played for Sophie Tucker, Judy Garland and Billy Eckstine and recorded with (among others) Larry Adler, Humphrey Lyttelton, the Melody Maker All Stars, George Chisholm and Sid Phillips.

== Session musician ==
As with many established jazz players, Mudele supplemented his appearances in clubs with extensive radio, television and recording studio work outside of jazz from the 1960s onwards. He appeared on many pop music sessions, wrote songs for Val Doonican and Adam Faith, played with Barry Gray on the soundtracks to the television series Thunderbirds and Joe 90, and featured as a regular on BBC radio's Sing Something Simple for 30 years with the Cliff Adams Singers. His name can be found in the session notes of artists such as Cilla Black, Johnny Cash, Bradley Cooper, Johnny Depp, John Lennon, Mantovani and Barbra Streisand. He backed Yehudi Menuhin and Stéphane Grappelli on their violin duets. George Martin used him regularly for sessions at Abbey Road Studios, and he can be heard on guitarist John Williams' Changes album (1971).

== Final years ==
In later life Mudele lived in Bromley and played weekly at the Bexley Jazz Club in Kent, taking over management duties after owner Les Simons died in 2004. In 2010 he recorded For All We Know, with Robin Aspland (piano) and Geoff Gascoyne (drums). He died aged 93, survived by his second wife Janet (who he married in 1991) and two daughters from his first marriage.
