= Ken Moule =

English pianist from London

- Born: Kenneth John Moule; 26 June 1925; Barking, England
- Died: 27 January 1986 (aged 60) Marbella, Spain
- Genres: Jazz
- Occupation(s): Musician, composer, arranger
- Instrument: Piano

Kenneth John Moule (26 June 1925 – 27 January 1986) was an English jazz pianist, best known as a composer and arranger.

== Biography ==
Moule was born in Barking, Essex, England, the only child of Frederick and Ethal Moule. Early childhood illness, which he barely survived, left him with a cadaverous look which went well with his ridiculous sense of humour.

=== 1940s ===
Moule played piano with the Johnny Dankworth Quartet, leaving to join Oscar Rabin in October 1945. He played with Remo Cavalotti (1946) for a summer season and Joe Daniels (1947) before working on the Queen Mary in Bobby Kevin's Band, with Ronnie Scott and Johnny Dankworth. Moule worked with several bands including; Jiver Hutchinson, Bert Ambrose, Frank Weir and Ken Mackintosh (1948–50).

=== 1950s ===
During the early 1950s Moule worked with Raymonde's Orchestra (1952), again with Bert Ambrose (1953) and with Frank Weir on several occasions. In 1954 Moule formed his own septet the 'Ken Moule Seven' which was a two-tenor, baritone, trumpet and three rhythm group. He resigned from the septet in 1955 (they continued to work as the 'Ken Moule Seven'). In 1956–1959 he arranged for Ted Heath's orchestra, and during this time composed the suite Jazz at Toad Hall, based on Kenneth Grahame's 1908 children's book The Wind in the Willows, which was released on Decca Records in 1958. Jazz at Toad Hall received significant critical acclaim on its initial release. He worked in Sweden (1959) and toured Europe with Kurt Weill's Band until March 1960.

=== 1960s ===
In the 1960s, Moule returned to England and worked freelance as an arranger, especially with Lionel Bart. He was the musical director for the shows Fings Ain't Wot They Used T'Be (1960–62) and Twang!! (1965–66). From 1962 he broadcast regularly with his 15-piece orchestra, entitled Ken Moule and his music. He later broadcast (and recorded) with a larger band called 'The Full Score'. His Adam's Rib Suite was recorded by the London Jazz Chamber Group in 1970; Kenny Wheeler was involved in the recording, which was issued on Ember Records. He scored Cole Porter songs for the musical Cole! performed at the Mermaid Theatre in 1974, and worked with Dankworth again around that time with his London Symphony Orchestra collaborations. He worked out of Germany for part of the 1970s, before ill health caused him to move to the warmer climate of Spain. He died in Marbella in 1986, aged 60.

== TV appearances ==
As well as working as the music arranger, Ken Moule appeared as Paul, the restaurant pianist, in several episodes during series 3 of the BBC's Secret Army.

Secret Army Episodes Appeared in –

- Episode 2 – Invasions (29 September 1979) – Paul (uncredited)
- Episode 3 – Revenge (6 October 1979) – Paul (uncredited)
- Episode 4 – A Safe Place (13 October 1979) – Paul (uncredited)
- Episode 5 – Ring of Rosies (20 October 1979) – Paul (uncredited)
- Episode 6 – Prisoner (27 October 1979) – Paul (uncredited)
- Episode 7 – Ambush (3 November 1979) – Paul (uncredited)
- Episode 8 – Just Light the Blue Touch Paper (10 November 1979) – Paul (uncredited)
- Episode 13 – The Execution (15 December 1979) – Paul (uncredited)

== Discography ==
| Year | Group Title | Album | Featuring | Label |
|---|---|---|---|---|
| Sept 1954 | Ken Moule Seven | – | Dave Usden, Keith Barr, Roy Sidwell, Don Cooper, Arthur Watts, Lennie Breslaw, Cab Kaye | Esquire |
| Oct 1954 | Ken Moule Six | Modern Jazz at the Royal Festival Hall | Dave Usden, Keith Barr, Roy Sidwell, Arthur Watts, Lennie Breslaw | Decca |
| Feb 1955 | Ken Moule Seven | – | Dave Usden, Keith Barr, Roy Sidwell, Arthur Watts, Lennie Breslaw | Decca |
| Feb 1955 | Ken Moule Seven | – | Dave Usden, Keith Barr, Roy Sidwell, Arthur Watts, Lennie Breslaw, Don Cooper, Cab Kaye | Decca |
| Nov 1956 | Jazz Today Unit | Third Festival of British Jazz | George Chisholm, Keith Christie, Geoff Taylor, Jimmy Walker, Joe Temperley, Dave Shephard, Jimmy McKenzie, Ken Sykora, Lennie Bush, Allan Ganley | Decca |
| Nov 1956 | George Chisholm-Keith Christie Quartet | Third Festival of British Jazz | George Chisholm, Keith Christie Lennie Bush, Allan Ganley | Decca |
| Nov 1956 | Ken Moule Arranges For: | Jazz at Toad Hall/Ken Moule Arranges For | Leon Calvert, George Chisholm, Dougie Robinson, Don Rendell, Ronnie Ross, Arthur Watts, Allan Ganley | Decca |
| Dec 1956 | Ken Moule Arranges For: | Jazz at Toad Hall/Ken Moule Arranges For | Leon Calvert, George Chisholm, Dougie Robinson, Don Rendell, Ronnie Ross, Arthur Watts, Allan Ganley | Decca |
| Jan 1957 | Don Rendell's Jazz Six | Don Rendell presents The Jazz Six | Kenny Wheeler, Bert Courtley, Don Rendell, Ronnie Ross, Arthur Watts, Don Lawson | Decca |
| Jan 1958 | Ken Moule's Music | Jazz at Toad Hall/Ken Moule Arranges For | Leon Calvert, George Chisholm, Dickie Hawdon, Johnny Scott, Roy Willox, Dougie Robinson, Bob Efford, Ronnie Ross, Bob Edwards, Arthur Watts, Allan Ganley | Decca |
| 1967 | The Cast of La Strada | La Strada (the Road) Studio Cast Recording | Lionel Bart, composer | Bayview Records |
| June 1970 | The London Jazz Chamber Group | Ken Moule's 'Adam's Rib Suite' | The Patrick Halling String Quartet, Kenny Wheeler, Roy Willox, Louis Stewart, Lennie Bush, Ronnie Stephenson | Ember |
| 1975 | Ken Moule Sextet | As Time Goes By | Jim Lawless, Len Walker, Johnny Dean, Lennie Bush, Harold Fisher | BBC Records |
| 1981 | Angela Richards and Ken Moule | Au Café Candide | Angela Richards, Allan Ganley, Lennie Bush | BBC Records |
