= Suite Sixteen =

Studio album by Victor Feldman
- Released: 1958
- Recorded: August 18 and September 12 & 21, 1955; Tempo Records, London, England
- Genre: Jazz
- Length: 45:00
- Label: Contemporary C 3541
- Producer: Tony Hall

Victor Feldman chronology
Experiment in Time (1955)	Suite Sixteen (1958)	Victor Feldman in London (1956)

Suite Sixteen is an album by vibraphonist Victor Feldman recorded in 1955 which was first released on the British Tempo Records and subsequently released on the Contemporary label in 1958.

== Reception ==
Professional ratings
Review scores
Source	Rating
Allmusic	5/5 stars
The Penguin Guide to Jazz Recordings	3.5/4 stars

The Allmusic review by Scott Yanow states: "The music is boppish with some surprises in the consistently swinging arrangements, giving one a definitive look at Victor Feldman near the beginning of his career".

== Track listing ==
All compositions by Victor Feldman except as indicated

1. "Cabaletto" - 2:53
2. "Elegy" - 3:32
3. "Suite Sixteen" (Tony Crombie) - 8:47
4. "Sonar" (Kenny Clarke, Gerald Wiggins) - 6:40
5. "Big Top" - 3:38
6. "Duffle Coat" (Allan Ganley) - 5:19
7. "Brawl for All" - 4:15
8. "Sunshine on a Dull Day" (Eddie Carroll) - 5:48
9. "Maenya" (Dizzy Reece) - 3:48
- Recorded in London, England on August 18, 1955 (tracks 4, 7 & 8), September 12, 1955 (track 3) and September 21, 1955 (tracks 1, 2, 5, 6 & 9)

== Personnel ==
- Victor Feldman - vibraphone, piano, drums, congas
- Jimmy Deuchar (tracks 1, 2, 4, 5 & 7–9), Dizzy Reece (tracks 1, 2, 4, 5 & 7–9), Jimmy Watson (tracks 1, 2, 5 & 9) - trumpet
- Ken Wray - trombone, bass trumpet (tracks 1, 2, 5 & 9)
- John Burden - French horn (tracks 1, 2, 5 & 9)
- Jimmy Powell - tuba (tracks 1, 2, 5 & 9)
- Derek Humble - alto saxophone (tracks 1, 2, 4, 5 & 7–9)
- Tubby Hayes, Ronnie Scott - tenor saxophone (tracks 1, 2, 5 & 9)
- Harry Klein - baritone saxophone (tracks 1, 2, 5 & 9)
- Tommy Pollard (tracks 3, 4, 7 & 8), Norman Stenfalt (tracks 1, 2, 5, 6 & 9) - piano
- Lennie Bush (tracks 1, 2 & 4–9), Eric Peter (track 3) - bass
- Tony Crombie (tracks 3, 4, 7 & 8), Phil Seamen (tracks 1, 2, 5, 6 & 9) - drums
