= Club Eleven =

Nightclub in London, England

Coordinates: 51.512543°N 0.138580°W

Club Eleven was a nightclub in London's Soho between 1948 and 1950 which played a significant role in the emergence of the bebop jazz movement in Britain.

== British bebop ==
The club was so named because it was a musicians cooperative with 11 founders – business manager Harry Morris along with ten British bebop players: Lennie Bush, Leon Calvert, Tony Crombie, Bernie Fenton (1921-2001, piano), Laurie Morgan (1926-2020, drums), Joe Mudele, double bass), Johnny Rogers (1926-2016, saxophone), Tommy Pollard, piano and vibes), Ronnie Scott, and Hank Shaw. Many of them had been influenced by hearing early bebop pioneers such as Charlie Parker and Dizzy Gillespie during New York stopovers while they performed as ship musicians on the Atlantic-going liners.

It was the first chance UK audiences had to hear the new bebop music, and was later viewed as "one of the most important milestones in the development of modern jazz in post-war Britain". However, as Ray Kinsella has pointed out, interest in bebop began developing a little earlier (from 1945 until 1947) at the Fullado Club in New Compton Street, where many of the musicians who were associated with the Club Eleven also played.

Club Eleven first opened at 41 Great Windmill Street in 1948, and had two house bands, one led by Ronnie Scott and the other by John Dankworth. Scott's sidemen included Bush, Crombie, Pollard and Shaw, while Dankworth's included Calvert, Fenton, Mudele and Morgan. When Scott toured the US, Don Rendell filled his spot. Denis Rose organised many of the activities at the club.

== Drugs raid ==
In 1950, the club moved to 50 Carnaby Street - a venue that had previously housed other jazz clubs, including the Florence Mills Social Parlour in the 1930s and the Blue Lagoon Club in the 1940s - but closed a few months later after a police raid. A ship's steward had been arrested in possession of cannabis, and under interrogation stated he had purchased the drugs at Club Eleven. This lead the police to raid the club on 15 April. The police raid recovered cannabis and cocaine, and an empty morphine ampoule. Several young white British men were arrested, shaking social assumptions about drug use being confined to the lower classes and non-whites.

== Sunset Club ==
The Jamaican landlord Gus Leslie opened the Sunset Club at the same address in 1951, and it became a popular venue for black US Army personnel still posted in London. Joe Harriott made his London debut at the club in 1951, and Lionel Hampton appeared in 1957. The Count Basie Orchestra and Sarah Vaughan also performed at the Sunset. The club closed in 1958 when the lease expired.

== Recognition ==
In 2009, Club Eleven was named by the Brecon Jazz Festival as one of 12 venues which had made the most important contributions to jazz music in the United Kingdom.

== See also ==
- List of jazz clubs
- Archer Street

== References and sources ==
Sources

- "Club Eleven"/"Nightclubs and Other Venues". Grove Jazz online.
- Reminiscences, Don Rendell (1967).
- http://henrybebop.co.uk/clubs.htm
