= Great Windmill Street =

Street in London, England

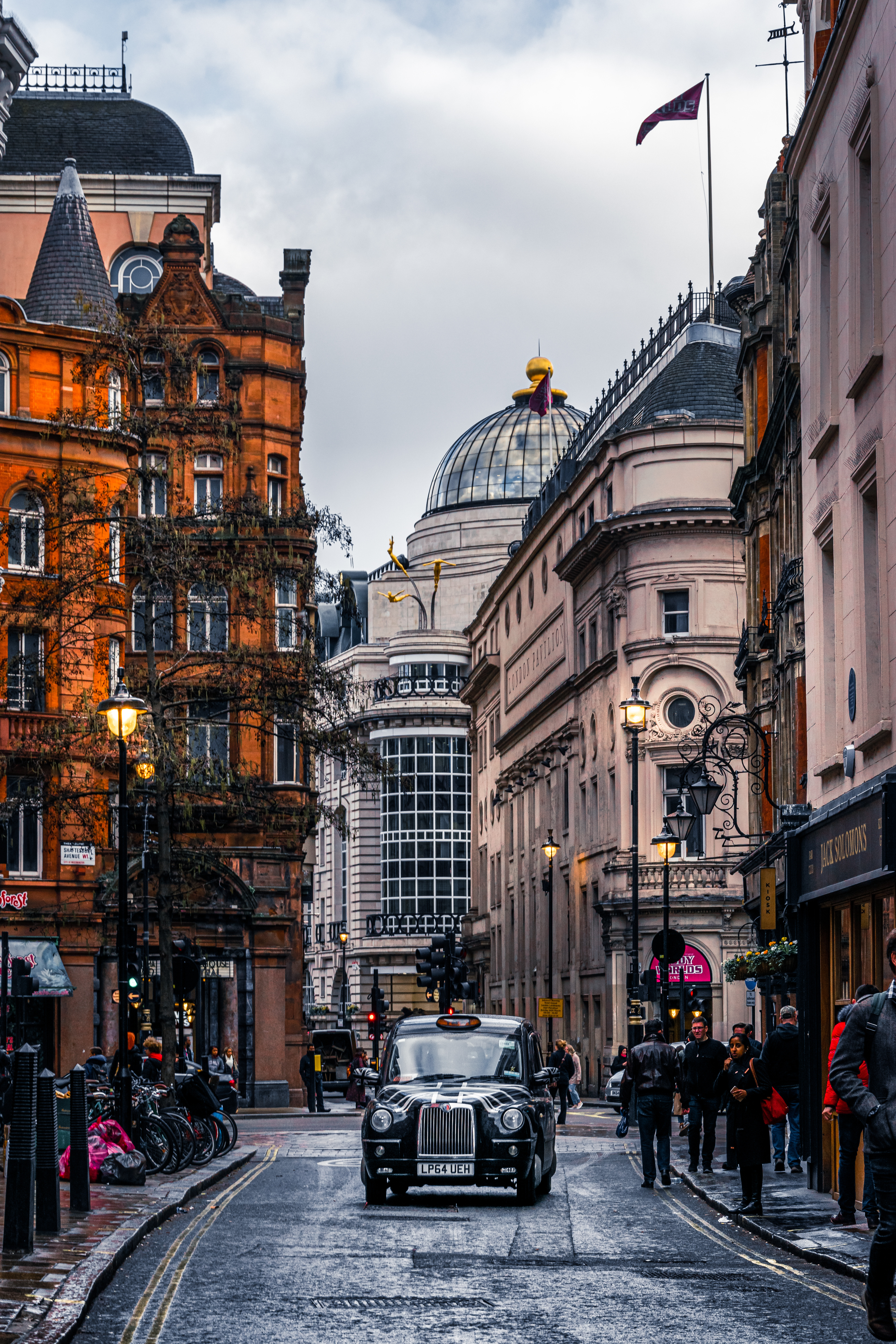
- Great Windmill Street looking towards Shaftesbury Avenue
- Interactive map of Great Windmill Street
- Length: 590 ft (180 m)
- Postal code: W1
- Nearest Tube station: Piccadilly Circus
- Coordinates: 51.5112°N 0.1343°W
- south end: A4 road Coventry Street
- Major junctions: A401; Shaftesbury Avenue
- north end: Brewer Street

Great Windmill Street is a thoroughfare running north–south in Soho, London, crossed by Shaftesbury Avenue. The street has had a long association with music and entertainment, most notably the Windmill Theatre, and stage door of the Lyric Theatre. It was formerly home to the Ripley's Believe It or Not! museum and the Trocadero shopping centre.

== Early history ==
The street took its name from a windmill on the site which was recorded 1585 and demolished during the 1690s. In a parliamentary survey of 1658 the mill was described as "well fitted with Staves and other materials".

The area was developed around 1665 but the building was speculative and of poor quality; this led to a royal proclamation in 1671 that prohibited unlicensed development in "Windmill Fields, Dog Fields and Soho". Later that year, Thomas Panton, one of the original speculators, was granted a licence to continue his scheme with the condition that it was supervised and directed by Sir Christopher Wren who was the Surveyor General of the King's Works. By 1682, maps show that both sides of the street were developed along their whole length.

== Medical school ==
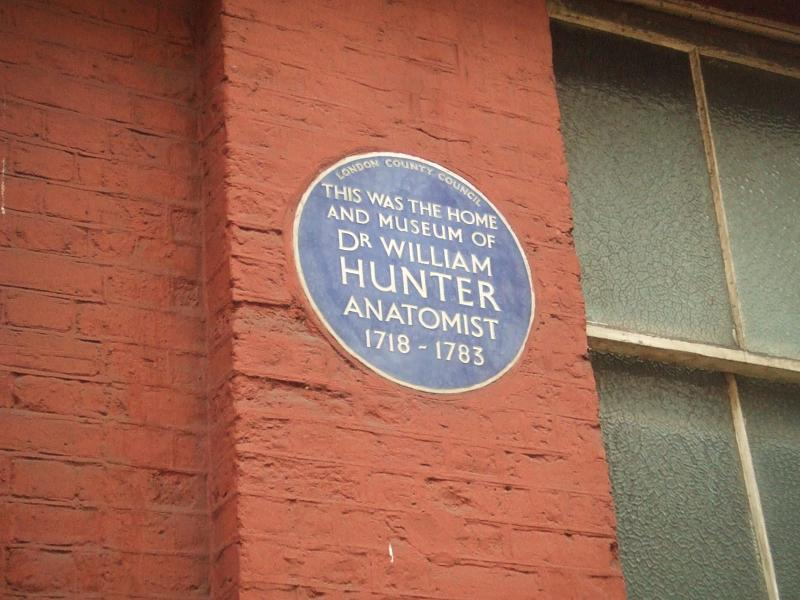
William Hunter plaque on what is now the side of the Lyric Theatre.

In 1767 the Scottish anatomist and physician William Hunter FRS built a large house at number 16 after demolishing an earlier large dwelling. Hunter's house incorporated a large library, a museum and an anatomical theatre. He gave lectures and anatomical demonstrations from the new house, the first taking place on 1 October 1776. After his death, in 1783 he bequeathed the school and his house to his nephew, Dr Matthew Baillie, who taught there from 1783 to 1803. The Windmill Street School of Anatomy was incorporated into King's College London in 1829 and Charles Bell was its first professor of physiology. The house was used for medical demonstrations until 1831. It now forms part of the dressing rooms and stage of the Lyric Theatre.

== Red Lion public house ==
The Red Lion public house was built on the corner with Archer Street in around 1793. In November 1847, the Communist League held its second congress in a room above the bar and it was here that Karl Marx and Frederick Engels submitted their proposals for writing the Communist Manifesto. The pub was an important social hub for political refugees from Germany in the mid-19 century, hosting the German Workers Educational Association which Marx was a member of. The Red Lion closed in around 2005 and in 2013 was the 'Be at One' Cocktail Bar and Lounge. Due to its association with Marx the pub is sometimes visited as part of the Karl Marx pub crawl.

== Entertainment ==
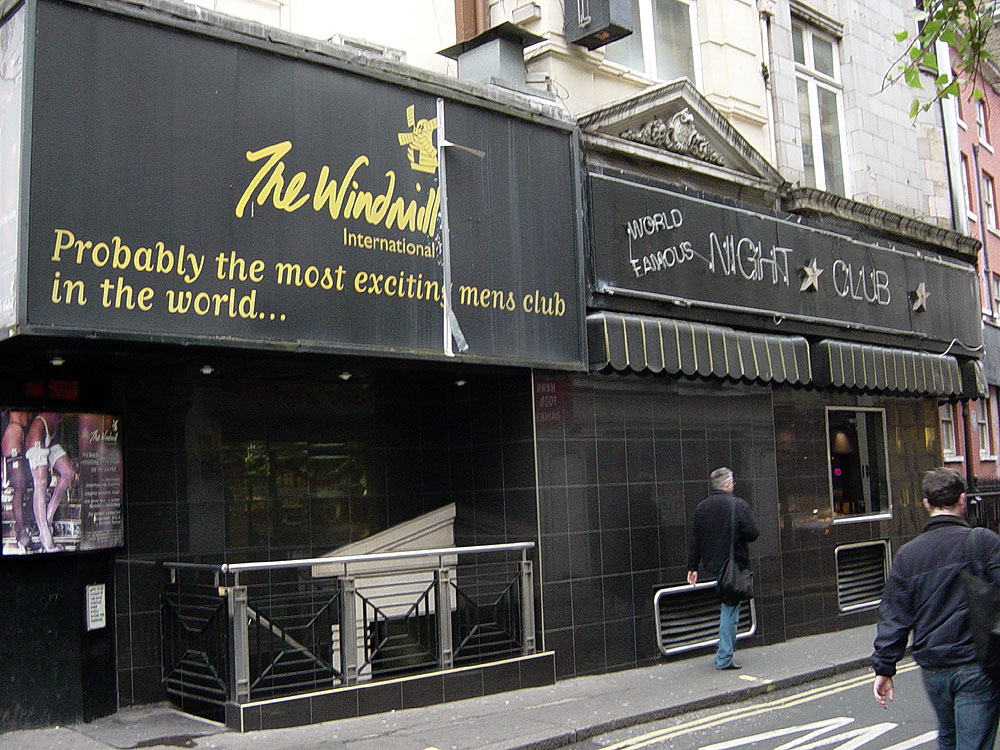
The Windmill Club, formerly the Windmill Theatre, now a table dancing club.

The street has had a long association with music and entertainment, most notably the Windmill Theatre where during the 1930s and 1940s Laura Henderson and Vivian Van Damm presented nude tableaux vivants. The theatre is now a table dancing club.

No 41, accessed from Ham Yard and now somewhere within the new Ham Yard Hotel, housed many nightclubs over the decades both upstairs and in the basement: the Hambone cocktail bar opened in 1922 (at 15 Ham Yard), Club Eleven was there from 1948 until it moved to Carnaby Street in 1950. It was the first regular paid modern jazz club for London musicians, featuring musicians such as Ronnie Scott, Hank Shaw, Johnny Rogers, Lennie Bush, Tony Crombie and Laurie Morgan. After that came Cy Laurie's Jazz Club in the 1950s, a key location in the trad jazz revival. In the 1960s, the Scene Club was associated with the mod youth culture and bands that appeared there included the Rolling Stones and The Who.

The street was also home to the Ripley's Believe It or Not! museum and the Trocadero shopping centre.
