= Murder of Louisa Dunne =

1967 murder in Bristol, England

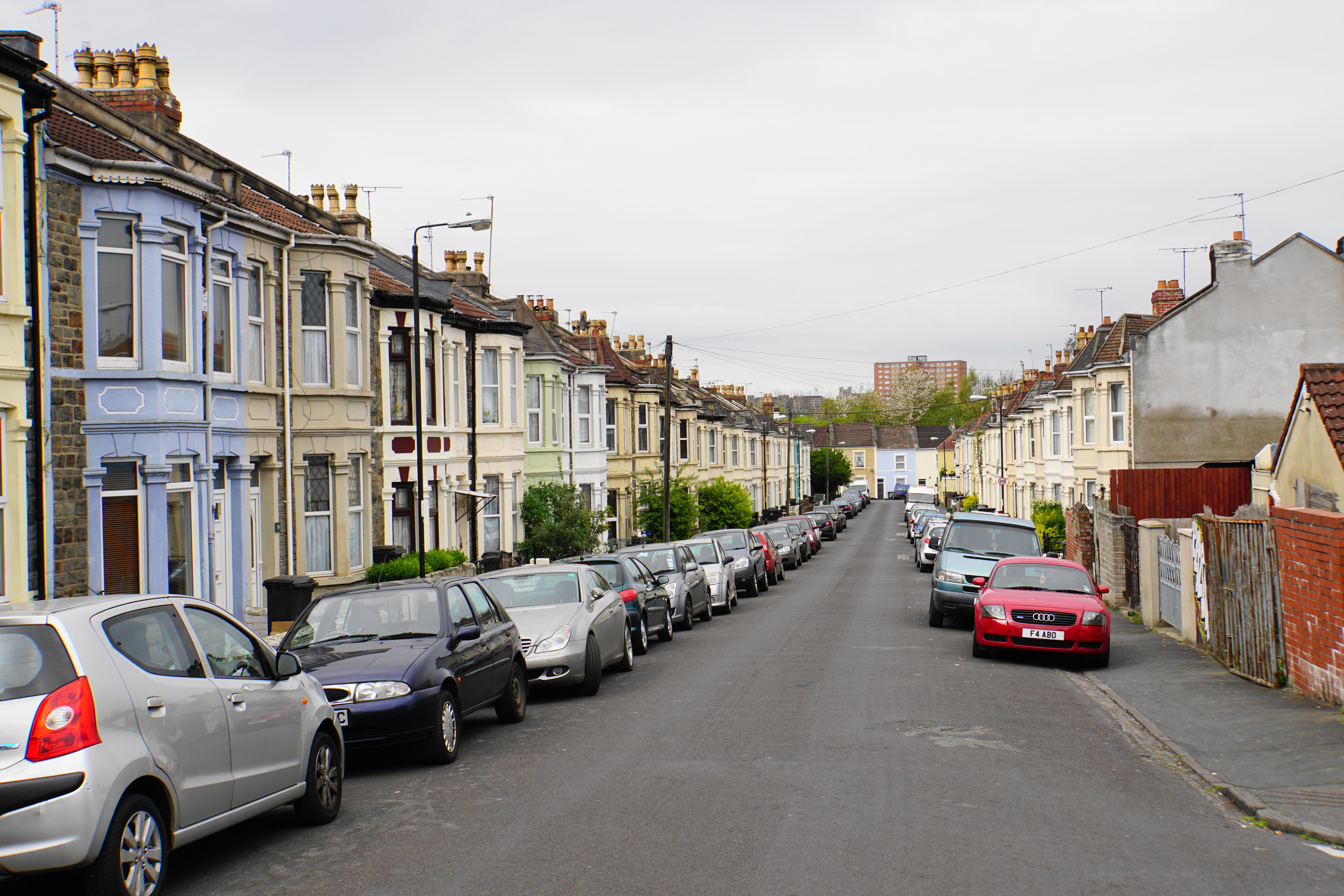
- Britannia Road, Easton, in 2017
- Location: Bristol, England
- Date: 28 June 1967; 59 years ago
- Attack type: Murder by strangulation, elder abuse, home invasion
- Victim: Louisa Dunne
- Perpetrator: Ryland Headley
- Verdict: Guilty on both counts
- Convictions: Murder, rape
- Sentence: Life imprisonment with a minimum of 20 years

On 28 June 1967, 75-year-old Louisa Dunne was murdered in her home in Bristol, England. After a 57-year investigation, Ryland Headley was arrested in connection with the case. In 2025, Headley was found guilty of both the rape and murder of Dunne and was sentenced to life imprisonment with a minimum term of 20 years. Headley was 92 years old at the time of his conviction. The crime is believed to be the oldest solved cold case in British history.

== Background ==
Louisa Dunne
- Born: Louisa Jane Jarrett; 1892; Barton Regis, Gloucestershire, England
- Died: 28 June 1967 (aged 75); Bristol, England
- Cause of death: Murder by strangulation
- Other name: Louisa Parker
- Spouse(s): Edwin Parker (m. 1915; died 1945) John Dunne (m. 1952; died 1961)
- Children: 2

Ryland Headley
- Born: September 1932 (age 94); West Indies
- Status: Incarcerated
- Criminal charges: Rape, murder
- Penalty: Life in prison, minimum term of 20 years

Louisa Jane Dunne (née Jarrett, 1892 – 28 June 1967) was a pensioner who had been widowed twice. She married Edwin "Teddy" Parker, a city councillor, in 1915, and the couple had two daughters, Edna and Iris. The couple were involved in the local Labour Party. She was expected to become the city's Mayoress until his death in 1945.

She later remarried nightwatchman John Dunne in 1952, but was widowed again following his death in 1961.

== Murder ==
Dunne was found dead at her home in 58 Britannia Road, Easton, by a neighbour on 28 June 1967. Dunne was discovered on the floor of her living room. She had been strangled and raped. Her cause of death was recorded as strangulation and asphyxiation. It is thought that she was murdered at some point between 26 and 28 June 1967.

== Criminal proceedings ==
=== Arrest ===
In 2023, the case was reviewed, including an examination of the forensic evidence. In November 2024, Ryland Headley, a 92-year-old man from Ipswich was arrested on suspicion of murder and rape, after being linked to the crime scene by DNA evidence. He was 35 years old at the time of the crime. Following formal charges announced by Avon and Somerset Police, the suspect first appeared before Bristol Magistrates' Court virtually, before the case moved to Bristol Crown Court for trial in June 2025.

=== Trial ===
Headley pleaded not guilty to both charges. The trial was expected to last three weeks.

The trial began on 16 June 2025. Prosecutors presented forensic findings, including DNA evidence recovered from Dunne's clothing, which had been stored for decades. The jury heard that the DNA match was "a billion times more likely" to belong to Headley than anyone else. Palmprints from the crime scene also matched Headley's prints.

Witness testimony also played a role, with neighbours recalling hearing screams on the night of Dunne's death. During the trial, the jury was presented with statements originally taken in 1967, in which witnesses described hearing a muffled scream, followed by crying out lasting several seconds. Additionally, a doctor who pronounced Dunne dead in 1967 gave evidence in court.

On 30 June 2025, 58 years after the crime was committed, 92-year-old Headley was found guilty by a jury of the rape and murder of Dunne. He was sentenced the following day to life imprisonment with a minimum term of 20 years: Justice Derek Sweeting informed Headley while setting the minimum term that he would never be released and would die in prison. Headley is believed to be the oldest person ever to be convicted of murder in Britain.

=== Perpetrator background and further investigations ===
Headley was born in the West Indies in September 1932 and emigrated to the United Kingdom in 1952. He settled in Bristol, where he lived through the 1950s and 1960s, and by 1958 had married. He and his wife went on to have three children. In the aftermath of Dunne's murder in 1967, Headley moved to a property located just beyond the perimeter of the initial police search and later settled in Ipswich. By the early 1970s, he was working as a railway machinist, a job he held while also committing a series of burglaries and other serious offences.

Between 1973 and 1978, Headley admitted to committing ten burglaries in Ipswich. In 1977, he was convicted of raping two elderly women and initially sentenced to life imprisonment. After a doctor told an appellate court that Headley's actions arose from sexual frustration caused by his marriage to an "ambitious and demanding" wife, his sentence was later reduced to seven years, of which he served roughly two.

Following his 2025 conviction for the rape and murder of Dunne, police in Suffolk and Norfolk began reviewing unsolved murders and rapes from the 1970s and 1980s, particularly those involving elderly women. Among the cases now under renewed scrutiny are the killings of Edna Harvey (1984), Doris Shelley (1993) and Karen Hales (1993).

== See also ==
- Murder of Margaret Cook – 1946 UK cold case murder which a man confessed to in 2015
