= Harry Klein =

English jazz saxophonist (1928–2010)

- Born: Harold Klein; 25 December 1928; Bethnal Green, London
- Died: 30 June 2010 (aged 81) London
- Genre: Jazz
- Occupation: Musician
- Instruments: Saxophone
- Years active: 1940s–1990s

Harry (Harold) Klein (25 December 1928 – 30 June 2010) was an English jazz saxophonist, a central figure in the development of modern British jazz in the 1950s. As a freelance session musician in the 1960s he played on recordings by the Beatles.

== Career ==
Klein was born in Bethnel Green, East London and began playing alto saxophone in local gigs from the age of 14. His first professional work was with the Ivor Kirchin band at the Paramount, Tottenham Court Road. From 1946 he performed with many bands, getting hired through the Archer Street jazz employment exchange and playing summer seasons. He switched to baritone sax in 1950 while playing with Jack Nathan. He performed with Nat Gonella and Victor Feldman in the late 1940s, Geoff Love's Octet in 1951, with Kenny Baker from September 1951 until early 1953 (and later with Kenny Baker's Dozen in the long running BBC radio series Let's Settle for Music), and regularly with Jack Parnell's Big Band.

Klein led his own quartet from 1953, joined the Tommy Whittle Quintet in 1954 and (at very short notice) toured in Europe with Stan Kenton in 1956. He was part of the Jazz Today Unit, an all star concert package which toured Britain with Gerry Mulligan’s Quartet and later the Modern Jazz Quartet. He also worked with Stan Tracey for several years in the 1950s and 1960s. Klein won the Melody Maker poll for best baritone sax player consecutively from 1953 to 1957 and for the next two decades he and Ronnie Ross were the UK's most famous baritone sax players. He also recorded with Tubby Hayes, Sammy Davis Jr., Dudley Moore, Champion Jack Dupree and Johnnie Spence.

In 1960 he was co-leading the Jazz Five on baritone with Vic Ash on tenor. Influenced by Horace Silver, the Jazz Five used the interplay between Ash’s tenor sax and Klein’s baritone as their calling-card. In July 1960 they played the fifth Beaulieu Jazz Festival, held over the Bank Holiday weekend. Agitation between the followers of trad jazz and modern jazz led to teenagers stormed the stage and tried to grab hold of Klein. Acker Bilk’s trad band was called on to play for over an hour to pacify the protestors. Two months later, the Jazz Five recorded the album The Five of Us in London. The group also included Brian Dee on piano, Malcolm Cecil on bass and Tony Mann on drums.

In the 1960s and 1970s, Klein increasingly turned to freelance studio musician work for English pop and rock bands and radio and television shows. Klein played on the Beatles' 1968 self-titled double album (also known as the "White Album"), on the songs "Honey Pie" (clarinet) and "Savoy Truffle" (saxophone). He accompanied singers including Tony Bennett, Ella Fitzgerald and Tom Jones. He was also one of the four saxophonists (along with Ronnie Scott, Bill Povey and Bill Jackman) who played on "Lady Madonna". Other credits include playing on records by Georgie Fame and Caravan.

He continued to perform later in life, reverting (due to back problems) to alto sax due to its lighter weight. He occasionally appeared as a walk on and small part actor, including roles in the soap opera Eastenders. He died in 2010, with his wife Pam dying a few days later.

== Discography ==
- Harry Klein Quartet/Quintet
  - Brash Baritone, Polygon EP JTE 105 (1955)
  - New Sound, Harry Klein Orchestra, Nixa/Pye EP, Nixa NJE 1009 (1955)
  - Baritone Sax, Columbia EP SEG 7647 (1956)
- With Kenny Baker's Dozen
  - Live at the BBC 1957, Acrobat Music ADDCD 3111 (2014)
- With Sammy Davis Jr
  - It's All Over but the Swingin', Decca DL 8641 (1957)
- With Victor Feldman
  - Suite Sixteen, Contemporary C 3541 (1958)
- Tony Crombie and Stan Tracey
  - Jazz Inc, Tempo TAP 30 (1960)
- The Jazz Five Featuring Vic Ash and Harry Klein
  - The Five of Us – Tempo Tap 32 (1961) - US title The Hooter, Riverside 361 (1961)
- Georgie Fame
  - The Two Faces of Fame, CBS BPG 63018 (1967)
- Tubby Hayes Big Band
  - Rumpus (1969 live recording), Savage Solweig SS-003CD (2015)
