= Al Gay =

- Born: Albert Goldstein; 25 February 1928
- Died: 12 October 2013 (aged 85) Bedfordshire
- Genres: Jazz
- Occupation: Saxophonist
- Instrument: Tenor saxophone
- Years active: 1953-2013
- Formerly of: Jive Bombers; The Animals' Big Band

Albert Gay (born Albert Goldstein; 25 February 1928 – 12 October 2013) was a British jazz tenor saxophonist.

== Biography ==
After having played with the Jive Bombers, Gay worked with Freddy Randall from 1953, and would return several times to Randall's future line-ups. In the early 1960s, he was with Bob Wallis' Storyville Jazzmen before going on to join Alex Welsh.

With fellow tenors Dick Morrissey and Stan Robinson, baritone sax Paul Carroll, and trumpets Ian Carr, Kenny Wheeler and Greg Brown, Al Gay formed part of The Animals' Big Band that made its one-and-only public appearance at the 5th Annual British Jazz & Blues Festival in Richmond on 5 August 1965.

In 1978, he played with the World's Greatest Jazz Band. As well as leading his own line-ups, Gay has also played in bands led by Digby Fairweather, Laurie Chescoe and Ron Russell, as well as with the Pizza Express All Stars.

== Personal life and death ==
Gay lived in Bedfordshire until his death in 2013; an obituary appeared in Jazz Journal's March 2014 edition.

== Discography ==
As sideman

- 1967: Hear Me Talkin' – Ruby Braff
- 1967: A Portrait of Henry "Red" Allen – Henry "Red" Allen/The Alex Welsh Band
- 1978: 100 Years of American Dixieland Jazz – Johnny Mince (Flutegrove)
- 1994: After Awhile – Dick Sudhalter
