= Leon Calvert =

British jazz trumpeter (1927–2018)

Leon Calvert (26 June 1927 – 1 May 2018) was a British bebop jazz trumpeter, and one of the co-founders of Club Eleven.

== Early career and Club Eleven ==
Calvert was born in Westcliffe-on-Sea and learnt to play the trumpet in his childhood. His family moved to Manchester while he was still very young. His first professional job was with Jack Nieman's Band at the Plaza in Manchester. By 1945 he was on the London circuit. From late 1947 he performed on the ocean liner Mauretania with Paul Lombard. He joined Oscar Rabin's band in 1948. That year he was one of the ten musician co-founders of Club Eleven in Great Windmill Street, and later Carnaby Street. At the club he played with the house band led by John Dankworth.

Calvert also worked with the Ambrose band (1949), the Steve Race Bop Band (1949), Tito Burns (1950–1951) and then for four years with Carroll Gibbons. In the mid-1950s he had stints with Ken Moule, Buddy Featherstonhaugh, the London Jazz Orchestra and Denny Boyce. In the late 1950s he worked with Tony Crombie and Vic Lewis.

== 1960s ==
In July 1961 he took over from Dick Hawdon as lead trumpeter for the John Dankworth Orchestra. He can be heard on many Ken Moule and Dankworth recordings of this period, his style influenced by the early work of Miles Davis. He was featured on Johnny Scott's London Swings in 1966.

Calvert began operating a jazz label at Lansdowne Studios in the 1960s with drummer Barry Morgan, Monty Babson and Jerry Allen. In 1967 the group founded Morgan Sound Studios at 169–171 High Road, Willesden. The studio was the location for recordings by notable artists and bands, including Joan Armatrading, Black Sabbath, The Cure, Donovan, Jethro Tull, the Kinks, Paul McCartney, Cat Stevens, Rod Stewart, UFO, Yes and many more. As a session musician he played for The Beatles in the brass section on Penny Lane, and trumpet and flugelhorn on Martha My Dear.

== 1970s ==
In the 1970s Calvert appeared on the recording of Richard Rodney Bennett's Jazz Calendar Suite (1971) and on Tony Kinsey's Thames Suite (1977). He worked mostly as a freelance musician for radio, television (such as the in-house Top of the Pops orchestra led by Johnny Pearson, where he was lead trumpet for eight years) and film (for instance, on the James Bond film You Only Live Twice with John Barry).

== Later life ==
In the 1980s, Calvert sometimes played as a duo with pianist Jack Honeybourne, and he continued playing at small jazz venues into the 1990s, with the Sounds of Seventeen, Jazz Spell and George Thorby's Band.

He died in Hatfield, Hertfordshire, at the age of 90.
