= Jive Bombers (British jazz band) =

The Jive Bombers were a British jazz band considered to have made the first be-bop recording in Britain.

Starting out as the Ilford Rhythm Club Jam Group, they performed at Red Cross concerts during the second world war and were featured in Picture Post performing at the Rainbow Room in Piccadilly, a popular wartime venue whose floor shows featured stars like Noël Coward, Danny Kaye and Edward G. Robinson. By 1945 they had changed their name to Jive Bombers, appearing in that year's Melody Maker Jazz Poll, and in 1947 they won the Melody Maker All-Britain Dance Band Championship.

Early band members included Al Gay on tenor sax, and Ronnie Chamberlain, on alto and soprano saxes, who had been in various line-ups led by Vic Lewis, and went on to join the Ted Heath Band. The later recording line-up comprised trumpeter Kenneth Sommerville, who had coincided with Chamberlain in Vic Lewis' orchestra, Kenneth Franklin (as, cl), Stanley Walker (p), Stanley Musgrave (g) Ronald Arrowsmith (b), and Sidney White (d).

Between 1942 and 1945, civilian personnel working for Lockheed Overseas Corporation based at the United States Army Air Force Base at Langford Lodge, Lough Neagh, in Ireland, had a band called the Jive Bombers that also performed in Belfast. It is not clear if these two bands are the same.

On the other hand, violinist Stephane Grappelli, who was in London between 1941 and 1943, composed and recorded his instrumental "Jive Bomber" around that time.

== Discography ==
- 1947: “Re-bop”/”Groovin' High” (Regal Zonophone MR3799)
- 1948: “Tea For Two”/”Interlude” (Regal Zonophone MR3818)
