= Allan Ganley =

British musician (1931–2008)

- Born: Allan Anthony Ganley; 11 March 1931; Tolworth, Surrey, England
- Died: 29 March 2008 (aged 77) Slough, Berkshire, England
- Genres: Jazz, dixieland
- Occupation(s): Musician, arranger
- Instruments: Drums
- Years active: Early 1950s–2008

Allan Anthony Ganley (11 March 1931 – 29 March 2008) was an English jazz drummer and arranger.

== Career ==
Ganley was born in Tolworth, Surrey, England. A self-taught drummer, in the early 1950s Ganley played in the dance band led by Bert Ambrose. In 1953, he came to prominence as a member of Johnny Dankworth's band. Also in the 1950s, he worked with Derek Smith, Dizzy Reece, Vic Ash, and Ronnie Scott. Towards the end of the decade he was co-leader with Ronnie Ross of a small group known as the Jazzmakers.

In the early 1960s, Ganley often worked with Tubby Hayes, playing with his small groups and the occasionally assembled big band. As house drummer at Ronnie Scott's Jazz Club he played with Dizzy Gillespie, Stan Getz, Jim Hall, Freddie Hubbard, and Rahsaan Roland Kirk. In the early 1970s, he took time out to study at Berklee College of Music in Boston, Massachusetts, then returned to the UK to form and lead a big band which he maintained sporadically for the next 10 years.

He was the drummer in the Joe Wylie Orchestra in the late 1960s and early 1970s at the Hamilton Princess Hotel, backing up many international artists. He was also a close friend of the drummer Andy Newmark whom he met during his time in Bermuda.

Throughout the 1970s and 1980s, Ganley could be seen and heard on countless broadcasts and recording dates, playing with jazz musicians of all styles. In the 1990s Ganley was as active as ever, playing club and festival dates throughout the UK with occasional overseas trips. The self-effacing nature of his playing made him a perfect accompanist for pianists such as Teddy Wilson and Al Haig, and for singers including Carol Kidd and Blossom Dearie. Although less well known for his work as an arranger, Ganley provided charts for many leading British jazz musicians as well as for the BBC Radio Big Band.

In 1995, Ganley fell and broke his ankle. Due to this incident and the shock which caused his hair to fall out, he did not play the drums for some time. He would regularly appear on stage wearing a large floppy beret. His drumming continued to entertain jazz lovers until his sudden death in early 2008. It has been stated that, "his work in particular with the late John Dankworth and his singing partner Cleo Laine, along with American saxophonist Scott Hamilton, the pianist Brian Lemon and the singer Elaine Delmar, provided an outstanding example of inspired tact and rhythmic intelligence".

Ganley died at Wexham Park Hospital, Slough, on 29 March 2008.

== Discography ==
=== As leader ===
- The Jazz Makers with Ronnie Ross (Atlantic, 1960)
- Bebop Live with the University College School All Stars (Spotlite, 2001)

=== As sideman ===
With John Dankworth

- Fair Oak Fusions (Sepia, 1982)
- About 42 Years Later (Avid, 2007)

With Tubby Hayes

- Down in the Village (Fontana, 1963)
- Late Spot at Scott's (Fontana, 1963)
- A Tribute to Tubbs (Spotlite, 1981)
- Tubbs' Tours (Mole, 1981)
- England's Late Jazz Great (IAJRC, 1987)
- Live in London (Harkit, 2004)
- BBC Jazz for Moderns (Gearbox, 2009)
- Voodoo Session (Trunk, 2009)
- Dancing in the Dark (Savage Solweig, 2011)
- Live at Ronnie Scott's (Gearbox, 2017)

With Scott Hamilton

- East of the Sun (Concord Jazz, 1993)
- Live at Brecon Jazz Festival (Concord Jazz, 1995)
- Christmas Love Song (Concord Jazz, 1997)

With Cleo Laine

- Shakespeare and All That Jazz (Fontana, 1964)
- A Lover and His Lass (Esquire, 1976)
- Cleo Laine Sings Word Songs (RCA, 1978)

With Spike Robinson

- It's a Wonderful World (Capri, 1985)
- In Town (Hep, 1987)
- The Gershwin Collection (Hep, 1988)

With others

- Vic Ash, The Eyes Have It (ABCDs, 1995)
- Bob Barnard, Class! (Calligraph, 1988)
- Ruby Braff, First Set (Zephyr, 1997)
- Ruby Braff, The Second Set (Zephyr, 1998)
- Dave Cliff, When Lights Are Low (Zephyr, 1998)
- Tony Coe, Blue Jersey (ABCDs, 1995)
- Tony Coe/Alan Barnes, Days of Wine and Roses (Zephyr, 1998)
- Kenny Davern, The Very Thought of You (Milton Keynes Music, 1984)
- Blossom Dearie, Sweet Blossom Dearie (Philips, 1990)
- Blossom Dearie, Live in London (Harkit, 2002)
- Brian Dee, Swing Doodle (Raphaele, 1980)
- Elaine Delmar, Strike Up the Band: Elaine Delmar Sings George Gershwin (Joy, 2006)
- Jack Dieval, Jack Dieval Trio (I.T.S. 1978)
- Elena Duran, California Suite/Suite for Flute and Jazz Piano (RCA, 1981)
- Elena Duran, Stephane Grappelli, Laurie Holloway, Brandenburg Boogie (His Master's Voice, 1980)
- Slim Gaillard, Anytime, Anyplace, Anywhere! (Hep, 1983)
- Stan Getz, Live in London (Harkit, 2002)
- Stan Getz, Live in London Vol. 2 (Harkit, 2004)
- Kenny Graham, Presenting Kenny Graham (Vocalion, 2008)
- Stephane Grappelli, Just One of Those Things (EMI, 1984)
- Jim Hall, Commitment (A&M/Horizon, 1976)
- Jim Hall, Live in London (Harkit, 2019)
- Joe Harriott & John Mayer, Indo-Jazz Suite (Columbia, 1966)
- Joe Harriott & John Mayer, Indo-Jazz Fusions (Columbia, 1967)
- Laurie Holloway, Hit Parade Holloway Style (Pye, 1966)
- Laurie Holloway & Cleo Laine, Loesser Genius (Qnote, 2003)
- Carol Kidd, The Night We Called It a Day (Linn, 1990)
- Carol Kidd, I'm Glad We Met (Linn, 1991)
- Roland Kirk, Gifts and Messages (Ronnie Scott's Jazz House, 1996)
- Brian Lemon & Roy Williams, How Long Has This Been Going On? (Zephyr, 1996)
- Brian Lemon, My Shining Hour (Zephyr, 2001)
- Bill Le Sage/Ronnie Ross, The Bill Le Sage/Ronnie Ross Quartet (World Record Club, 1964)
- Vic Lewis, Big Band Explosion (Ember, 1964)
- John Mayer, Indo-Jazz-Fusions (Disques Somethin' Else 1969)
- Yehudi Menuhin & Stephane Grappelli, Top Hat (His Master's Voice, 1984)
- Yehudi Menuhin & Stephane Grappelli, Menuhin & Grappelli Play Jealousy & Other Great Standards (EMI, 1988)
- Marion Montgomery, I Gotta Right to Sing (Ronnie Scott's Jazz House, 1988)
- Marion Montgomery, Sometimes in the Night (Elgin, 1989)
- David Newton, Victim of Circumstance (Linn, 1990)
- David Newton, Eye Witness (Linn, 1991)
- Steve Race, Take One (World Record Club, 1965)
- Ernest Ranglin, Wranglin' (Island, 1964)
- Angela Richards, Au Cafe Candide (BBC, 1981)
- Ronnie Scott/Phil Seamen, Ronnie Scott Quintet & Phil Seamen Quintet (Gearbox, 2011)
- Martin Taylor, Don't Fret! (Linn, 1990)
- Warren Vaché & Alan Barnes, Memories of You (Zephyr, 1999)
- Warren Vache & Tony Coe, Street of Dreams (Zephyr, 1999)
- Warren Vache & Tony Coe, Jumpin (Zephyr, 1999)
- Warren Vache & Dave Cliff, The Best Thing for You (Zephyr, 2001)
- Mary Lou Williams, The London Sessions (Vogue, 1993)
- Kai Winding/Mangelsdorff/Watrous/Whigham, Trombone Summit (MPS, 1981)
