= Terry Devon =

British singer (1922–2013)

- Born: Toby Teresa Dekovnick; 19 May 1922; London, England
- Died: 5 April 2013 (aged 90); London, England
- Occupation: Jazz singer
- Years active: 1938–1950s
- Spouse: Tito Burns (m. 1948; died 2010)
- Children: 2

Teresa Devon (born Toby Teresa Dekovnick; 19 May 1922 – 5 April 2013) was a British jazz singer. She worked as a hairdresser in her father's business but switched to singing after winning a crooning competition on Radio Luxembourg. Devon joined the Billy Thorburn orchestra and her first record was released in 1938. She was heard weekly on the BBC radio comedy programme Take It From Here. Devon later became a vocalist for the Tito Burns jazz Septet, developing the skill of scat singing. Burns and Devon married in November 1948. She subsequently stopped singing professionally, and helped her husband to manage notable singers.

== Early life ==
Toby Teresa Dekovnick was born on 19 May 1922 in Mile End in the East End of London. She was the only child of second generation Russian immigrants Manny and Connie Dekovnick (née Lofeas).

Manny worked as a hairdresser in Shepherd's Bush. Although Devon won a scholarship to attend a grammar school, she left early to assist in her father's business.

== Career ==
After she won a crooning competition on Radio Luxembourg, she changed her career path to singing. At the age of 16, Devon auditioned for the Billy Thorburn orchestra, known as The Organ, the Dance Band and Me. He initially considered her too young, but recognised her abilities and made her the band's female vocalist.

Devon's first record, "Any Old Hearts to Mend" was released in 1938, and her first radio broadcast came the following year. Devon toured with Thorburn in the 1940 revue Ssh… Keep It Dark. The singer then joined the Oscar Rabin Band as a vocalist, and entertained British Armed Forces troops overseas. Devon recalled in her later years that the ship she was performing on sailing through minefields and then hitting the pier which separated it into two. After the war, she joined The Keynotes harmony group, and broadcast weekly on the BBC radio comedy programme Take It From Here.

Devon became a vocalist for the Tito Burns jazz band and developed a skill for scat singing. She sang ballads, and her voice was occasionally used instrumentally alongside the trumpet and saxes in arrangements. On occasion, Burns and Devon sang together as a duo, in the manner created by the American husband and wife team Jackie Cain and Roy Kral. Among her recordings for Decca were "Be Bop Spoken Here", a duet with Burns, and "I'm Forever Blowing Bubbles". She also worked with other bands in this period, including Geraldo, and toured as a duo with Len Camber.

== Personal life and death ==
Devon married Tito Burns in November 1948, and the marriage produced two children.

She helped her husband represent singer Cliff Richard, The Searchers, and The Zombies, and promoted the British tours of Tony Bennett and Victor Borge. Although Devon did not return to singing professionally, she was seen on the television game show Countdown as a contestant. She died on 5 April 2013 in London at the age of 90.
