= Murder of Margaret Cook =

1946 murder in London, England

Margaret Cook was a woman who was shot dead on 9 November 1946 outside the Blue Lagoon nightclub in Carnaby Street, London. In 2015 a man living in Canada confessed to the shooting which would make this the longest gap between a crime and a confession in British criminal history.

== Shooting ==
26-year-old Margaret Cook was originally from Bradford and a prostitute in London. She was shot in a narrow passage outside the club. Witnesses described a man aged about 25 to 30 in a pork-pie hat and Burberry coat, but lost sight of him. Although a labourer from Lanarkshire was named as a suspect by police, nobody was ever charged with the crime.

== Confession ==
In 2015 a 91-year-old man living in a care home confessed to killing a woman with a Russian-made World War II pistol to Canadian police. Scotland Yard detectives interviewed him and though he could not remember the name of the woman he picked out a photo of Margaret Cook. He wanted to clear his conscience after being diagnosed with cancer. British authorities tried to extradite him, but as of July 2015 the Canadian government had not replied.

It has been claimed that this is the longest time between a crime and a confession in British history.
