= Kenny Graham =

British musician (1924–1997)

- Born: Kenneth Thomas Skingle; 19 July 1924; Ealing, London, England
- Died: 17 February 1997 (aged 72) London, England
- Genres: Jazz, bebop
- Occupations: Musician, composer, arranger
- Instruments: Tenor saxophone, alto
- Years active: 1940–1980s

Kenny Graham (born Kenneth Thomas Skingle; 19 July 1924 – 17 February 1997) was a British jazz saxophonist, arranger, composer and essayist, described as "one of Britain's foremost jazz composers and arrangers", and as "a genuine, often overlooked pioneer of the modern jazz movement in Britain".

== Life ==
He was born in Ealing, London, and learned to play the banjo as a young child. He then learned the saxophone, with the tenor sax his preferred instrument by the time he became a professional musician at the age of 16. He joined the army in 1942, expecting to join a service band, but was turned down for that role and went absent without leave, dyeing his red hair black and working under the name Tex Kershaw for two years as a member of Johnny Claes's Claepigeons.

After the end of the war, he played in many of the leading British dance bands of the era, including those led by Nat Temple, Nat Gonella, Ambrose, Leslie "Jiver" Hutchinson and Eric Winstone, as well as in Victor Feldman's Sextet, before forming Kenny Graham's Afro-Cubists in April 1950. The band sought to develop "an amalgam of bebop, African and Cuban rhythms and super-modern harmonies". Although "artistically successful" and acclaimed for its innovative style, the band did not gain a large enough audience and the original band folded in March 1952 when trumpeter Jo Hunter and drummer Dicky DeVere left. However, a new band of Afro-Cubists performed at the opening night of the Flamingo Club in Soho in August 1952. Graham also played baritone sax in Jack Parnell's band, and tenor with other bands, occasionally reconvening the Afro-Cubists for recordings and performances. The Afro-Cubists recorded two EPs in 1954, Afro-Cadabra and Excerpts from Caribbean Suite, with a band including saxophonist Eddie Mordue and drummer Phil Seamen.

From 1955, Graham became more active as a writer and arranger than as a performer. In 1956, inspired by the work of American musician Moondog, he recorded an album, Moondog And Suncat Suites, credited to Kenny Graham And His Satellites, which included treatments of some of Moondog's compositions as well as Graham's own. The following year he recorded an album, Presenting Kenny Graham, for the Pye Nixa label, featuring Seamen and pianist Stan Tracey, and engineered by Joe Meek.

Following a serious illness in 1958, Graham gave up performing completely. He wrote for several bands including that of Ted Heath, composing the Beaulieu Festival Suite recorded by Heath in 1959, and also worked as an arranger at recording sessions. Inspired by the music of Duke Ellington, he was commissioned to write a series of compositions for Ellington's musicians in 1960, which were recorded by a band that included Harry Carney, Paul Gonsalves, Ray Nance and Sam Woodyard. He also directed recording sessions by blues musicians including Big Bill Broonzy and Josh White, and worked extensively as a writer and arranger with Humphrey Lyttelton, composing the piece "One Day I Met an African" which Lyttelton recorded several times. In 1980, Graham wrote further pieces for Lyttelton's band, including "Adagio For David" and "Ladyless and Lachrymose". He also wrote for films such as The Small World of Sammy Lee (1963), Night Train to Paris (1964) and Where the Bullets Fly (1966), and an orchestral suite, "The Labours of Heracles", for BBC Radio.

He wrote occasional and acerbic essays on music for various magazines. He was dismissive of much modern popular music, including rock and roll. It was said of him that "he was completely dedicated to his strong belief in how jazz should sound", and was described as "a man of uncompromised integrity in both his musical and personal life [who] hated insincerity and crassness", and who had a "mercurial temperament".

He experimented with electronic keyboards, and became an expert in electronics. He worked as a London Underground ticket machine maintenance engineer, and also became a skilled maker of clocks and watches. In later life he worked as a caretaker of an apartment block in Putney, and became something of a recluse.

He died in London in 1997, aged 72.
