= Denis Rose =

British musician (1922–1984)

- Born: 31 May 1922; London, United Kingdom
- Died: 22 November 1984 (aged 62) London, United Kingdom
- Genre: Jazz
- Occupation: Musician
- Instruments: Piano, trumpet
- Years active: 1940s–1970s
- Label: Esquire

Denis Rose (May 31, 1922, in London – November 22, 1984, in London) was an English jazz pianist and trumpeter. He was a longtime fixture on the London jazz scene and was an early influence on British bebop.

Rose played with Johnny Claes in the 1940s, but dodged conscription during World War II and did little performing over the course of the war. He worked with Cab Kaye's Ministers of Swing late in 1948, then organized jam sessions with British musicians such as Ronnie Scott in the late 1940s and early 1950s, many of which took place at Club Eleven. Rose recorded very little, though he did a session with Scott in 1949 for Esquire Records. He continued to perform locally in London for several decades, and recorded with Maggie Nicols in the early 1970s.

16mm film footage shot by Rose around London's Archer Street was used to compile the BBC documentary The Street in 1985.
