= Victor Feldman =

English jazz musician (1934–1987)

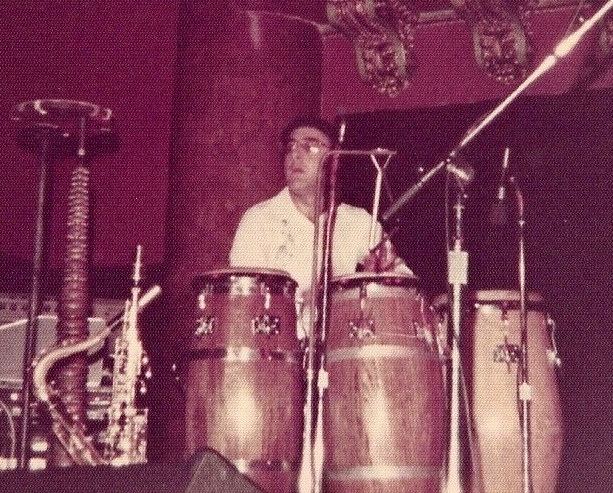
- Feldman with L.A. Express in San Francisco, 1976

Background information
- Born: Victor Stanley Feldman; 7 April 1934; Edgware, Middlesex, England
- Died: 12 May 1987 (aged 53) Woodland Hills, California, United States
- Genre: Jazz
- Occupation: Musician
- Instruments: Vibraphone; drums; percussion; piano
- Formerly of: Miles Davis; Lighthouse All-Stars; Steely Dan

Victor Stanley Feldman (7 April 1934 – 12 May 1987) was an English jazz musician who played mainly piano, vibraphone, and percussion. He began performing professionally during childhood, eventually earning acclaim in the UK jazz scene as an adult. Feldman emigrated to the United States in the mid-1950s, where he continued working in jazz and also as a session musician with a variety of pop and rock performers.

== Early life ==
Feldman was born in Edgware on 7 April 1934. He caused a sensation as a musical prodigy when he was discovered, aged seven. His family were all musical and his father founded the Feldman Swing Club in London in 1942 to showcase his talented sons. Feldman performed from a young age; from 1941 to 1947 he played drums in a trio with his brothers; when he was nine he took up piano; when he was 14 started playing vibraphone. He featured in the films King Arthur Was a Gentleman (1942) and Theatre Royal (1943). In 1944, he was featured at a concert with Glenn Miller's AAAF band, as "Kid Krupa" (in reference to drummer Gene Krupa). He also took a prominent role in the musical Piccadilly Hayride (1946–1948).

== Professional life and career ==
His drums teacher Carlo Krahmer encouraged Feldman to play the vibraphone, which he did first in the Ralph Sharon Sextet and later in the Roy Fox band. Feldman played with Vic Lewis and Ted Heath. Feldman played with Sharon from late 1949 to 1951, including performances in Switzerland. There were further overseas trips with Ronnie Scott (to Paris in 1952) and Harry Parry (to India). He also played with Parry in the UK from October 1953 to January 1954. From 1954, when he recorded with Jimmy Deuchar, and played again with Scott, he was working mainly as a pianist and vibraphonist; his early vibraphone playing showed the influence of Milt Jackson.

He was a notable percussionist, but it was as a pianist and vibraphone player that he became best known.

Feldman recorded with Ronnie Scott's orchestra and quintet from 1954 to 1955, which also featured other important British jazz musicians such as Phil Seamen and Hank Shaw. It was Scott who recommended that Feldman emigrate to the US, which he did in 1955. Once there, his first steady work was with the Woody Herman Herd. Afterward he studied arranging with Marty Paich. He had frequent return trips to the UK over the following years. His eight-week visit in 1956–57 included studio recording sessions and club appearances. After Herman he joined Buddy DeFranco for a short time. In 1958, he had his own working band on the west coast, which included the innovative bassist Scott LaFaro. His 1958 album The Arrival of Victor Feldman includes LaFaro and Stan Levey on drums. He recorded with many jazz artists, including Benny Goodman, George Shearing, Cannonball Adderley and Miles Davis, most notably on Davis' 1963 album Seven Steps to Heaven, the title tune of which was Feldman's composition. Davis invited Feldman to join his group full-time, but Feldman declined, preferring the stability of studio work to the career of a touring musician. The 5-CD Shelly Manne Black Hawk set, originally released on LP in September 1959, is a good representation of Feldman's unmistakable driving comping behind the soloists, helping to define the session as a valuable hard bop genre element.

In 1957, Feldman settled in Los Angeles permanently and then specialised in lucrative session work for the US film and recording industry, with the exception of joining the Cannonball Adderley Quintet in 1960–61. Feldman's vibraphone soloing is featured extensively on the Grammy Award–winning The Music from Peter Gunn, with AllMusic writing, "There's some particularly impressive work by drummer Shelly Manne and vibes player Victor Feldman, whose cool, understated playing seems to deliberately recall that of Milt Jackson."

He also branched out to work with a variety of musicians outside of jazz, recording with artists such as Frank Zappa in 1967, Joni Mitchell in the 1970s and Tom Waits and Joe Walsh in the 1980s. Feldman is the only musician to appear on all seven Steely Dan albums released in the 1970s and 1980s (prior to the band's long hiatus) aside from its leaders Walter Becker and Donald Fagen. Though he does not appear on Steely Dan's non-album single "Dallas" b/w "Sail the Waterway", he did play on Poco's cover of "Dallas".

Feldman died of a heart attack in 1987 at his home in Los Angeles, aged 53, following an asthma attack.

In 2009, he was inducted in the Musicians Hall of Fame and Museum in Nashville.

== Discography ==
=== As leader ===
Year recorded	Title	Label	Year released	Personnel/Notes
1948–54	The Young Vic	Esquire	1987	Nine quartet tracks, with John Dankworth (clarinet), Eddie Thompson (piano), Bert Howard (bass), Feldman (drums); Feldman (vibes), Stan Watson (guitar), Lennie Bush (bass), Freddie Manton (drums); four trio tracks, with Feldman (vibes), Bush (bass), Tony Crombie (drums); two solo tracks, with Feldman (vibes, piano, drums)
1955	Suite Sixteen	Tempo/Contemporary	1958	Three septet tracks, with Jimmy Deuchar, Dizzy Reece (trumpet), Derek Humble (alto sax), Feldman (vibes), Tommy Pollard (piano), Lennie Bush (bass), Tony Crombie (drums); five quartet tracks, with Feldman (vibes), Pollard (piano), Eric Peter (bass), Crombie (drums); Feldman (vibes), Norman Stenfalt (piano), Bush (bass), Phil Seamen (drums); four big band tracks, with Deuchar, Reece, Jimmy Watson (trumpet), Ken Wray (trombone, bass trumpet), John Burden (French horn), Jimmy Powell (tuba), Humble (alto sax), Tubby Hayes, Ronnie Scott (tenor sax), Harry Klein (baritone sax), Feldman (vibes, drums, congas), Stenfalt (piano), Bush (bass), Seamen (drums)
1956	Victor Feldman in London, Vol. 1: The Quartet	Tempo	1957	Quartets, with Feldman (vibes), Terry Shannon (piano), Pete Blannin (bass), Phil Seamen (drums); Feldman (vibes, piano), Shannon (piano), Lennie Bush (bass), Phil Seamen (drums), Dizzy Reece (trumpet, one track)
1956–57	Transatlantic Alliance	Tempo	1958	Five quartet tracks, with Dizzy Reece/Jimmy Deuchar (trumpet), Feldman (piano), Lloyd Thompson/Kenny Napper (bass), Phil Seamen (drums); one sextet track, with Reece (trumpet), Ronnie Scott (tenor sax), Tubby Hayes (baritone sax), Feldman (piano), Lennie Bush (bass), Tony Crombie (drums); one trio track, with Feldman (piano), Bush (bass), Benny Goodman (drums)
1956–57	Victor Feldman in London, Vol. 2: Big Band	Tempo	1957	Six big band tracks, with Jimmy Deuchar, Bobby Pratt, Dizzy Reece (trumpet), Ken Wray (bass trumpet), John Burden (French horn), Jimmy Powell (tuba), Derek Humble (alto sax), Ronnie Scott (tenor sax), Tubby Hayes (tenor, baritone sax), Joe Temperley/Pete King (baritone sax), Feldman (vibes), Norman Stenfalt (piano), Lennie Bush (bass), Phil Seamen (drums)
1957	Vic Feldman on Vibes	Mode	1957	Four quartet tracks, with Feldman (vibes), Carl Perkins (piano), Leroy Vinnegar (bass), Stan Levey (drums); three sextet tracks, with Frank Rosolino (trombone), Harold Land (tenor sax) added; reissued as Mallets A Fore Thought (Interlude, 1959)
1958	The Arrival of Victor Feldman	Contemporary	1958	Trio, with Feldman (vibraharp, piano), Scott LaFaro (bass), Stan Levey (drums)
1958; 1965	His Own Sweet Way	Ronnie Scott's Jazz House	1996	Trio, with Feldman (piano, vibes), Rick Laird (bass), Ronnie Stephenson (drums); live
1959	Latinsville!	Contemporary	1960	Five octet tracks, with Conte Candoli (trumpet), Walter Benton (tenor sax), Feldman (vibes), Vince Guaraldi (piano), Scott LaFaro/Al McKibbon (bass), Mongo Santamaria (congas), Armando Peraza (bongos), Willie Bobo (timbales); four tentet tracks, with Frank Rosolino (trombone) and Stan Levey (drums) added; three quintet tracks, with Feldman (vibes), Andy Thomas (piano), Tony Reyes (bass), Ramon Rivera (congas), Frank Guerrero (timbales)
1960–61	Merry Olde Soul	Riverside	1961	Six trio tracks, with Feldman (piano, vibes), Sam Jones/Andy Simpkins (bass), Louis Hayes (drums); three quartet tracks, with Hank Jones (piano) added
1962	Stop the World I Want to Get Off	World Pacific	1962	Trio, with Feldman (piano, vibes), Bob Whitlock (bass), Lawrence Marable (drums)
1962	A Taste of Honey and a Taste of Bossa Nova	Infinity	1962	Seven quartet tracks, with Nino Tempo (tenor sax), Feldman (piano), Bob Whitlock (bass), Colin Bailey (drums); Buddy Collette (tenor sax, flute), Feldman (piano, vibes), Leroy Vinnegar (bass), Ron Jefferson (drums); four quintet tracks, with Clifford Scott (flute, tenor sax), Feldman (piano, vibes), Laurindo Almeida (guitar), Al McKibbon (bass), Chico Guerrero (drums)
1962	Soviet Jazz Themes	Äva	1963	Sextets, with Harold Land (tenor sax), Nat Adderley (cornet), Feldman (vibes), Joe Zawinul (piano), Bob Whitlock (bass), Frank Butler (drums); Land (tenor sax), Carmell Jones (trumpet), Feldman (piano, vibes) Herb Ellis (guitar), Whitlock (bass), Butler (drums)
1964	Love Me with All Your Heart	Vee Jay	1964	Feldman (piano), with unknown others
1964	It's a Wonderful World	Vee Jay	1965	Quartet, with Bill Perkins (flute), Feldman (piano, vibes), Monty Budwig (bass), Colin Bailey (drums)
1967	Victor Feldman Plays Everything in Sight	Pacific Jazz	1967	With Feldman (piano, vibes, drums, Novachord, alto vibes, tympani, electric piano, electric Fender bass piano, organ, marimba, xylophone, congas, tambourine, chocalho, jawbone, cabasa, cowbell, triangle, squeak sticks, sand blocks)
1967	The Venezuela Joropo	Pacific Jazz	1967	Four quintet tracks, with Bill Perkins (flute, alto flute), Feldman (vibes, marimba, harpsichord), Dennis Budimir (guitar), Monty Budwig (bass), Colin Bailey (drums); five octet tracks, with Perkins (flute, alto flute), Dorothy Remsen (harp), Emil Richards (vibes, marimba), Feldman (vibes, marimba, harpsichord), Al Hendrickson (guitar), Max Bennett (bass), Larry Bunker (timbales), Milt Holland (maracas, percussion)
1973	Your Smile – with Tom Scott	Choice	1974	Quartet, with Feldman (piano, vibes, percussion), Tom Scott, (flute, alto flute, alto and tenor sax), Chuck Domanico (bass), John Guerin (drums); reissued as Rockavibabe (DJM, 1977) and Seven Steps to Heaven (Choice, 2009)
1977?	The Artful Dodger	Concord Jazz	1977	Quartet, with Jack Sheldon (trumpet, vocals), Feldman (piano, Fender Rhodes piano), Monty Budwig/Chuck Domanico (bass), Colin Bailey (drums)
1977	In My Pocket	Cohearent Sound	1978	Sextet, with Feldman (piano, Fender Rhodes piano), Hubert Laws (flute), Fred Tackett (guitar), Chuck Domanico (bass), Harvey Mason (drums), Eddie Karam (marimba); reissued as Rio Nights (TBA, 1987)
1978	Together Again	Yupiteru	1978	Trio, with Feldman (piano), Monty Budwig (bass), Shelly Manne (drums)
1982	Secret of the Andes	Nautilus	1982	Septet, with Victor Feldman (piano, Fender Rhodes piano, percussion), Hubert Laws (flute, alto flute, piccolo flute), Harvey Mason (drums, percussion), Lee Ritenour (guitar), Abraham Laboriel (bass, percussion), Alex Neciosup Acuña (percussion, drums), Milt Holland (percussion), Trevor Feldman (percussion, one track)
1983	Soft Shoulder	Palo Alto	1983	As Generation Band; with sons Trevor Feldman (drums), Jake Feldman (bass), and Josh Feldman (management), Tom Scott and various others
1983	To Chopin with Love	Palo Alto	1984	Trio, with Victor Feldman (piano), John Patitucci (bass), Trevor Feldman (drums)
1984	Call of the Wild	TBA	1984	As Generation Band; with sons Trevor Feldman (drums), and Josh Feldman (mixing engineer), Tom Scott, Robben Ford and various others
1984	Fiesta	TBA	1984	With Chuck Mangione (flugelhorn, trumpet), Chick Corea (keyboards), Dianne Reeves (vocals)
1985	High Visibility	TBA	1985	As Victor Feldman's Generation Band; with various
1986	Smooth	TBA	1986	Septet, with Victor Feldman (Fender Rhodes piano, acoustic piano, percussion, synthesizer), Tom Scott (Lyricon, soprano and tenor sax), Lee Ritenour (guitar), Joseph Conlan (synthesizers and programmed drums), Nathan East (bass), Trevor Feldman (drums)

=== As sideman ===
With David Ackles

- Subway to the Country (Elektra Records, 1970)

With Arthur Adams

- I Love Love Love My Lady (A&M Records, 1979)

With Pepper Adams

- California Cookin' (Interplay, 1991)

With Cannonball Adderley

- Cannonball Adderley and the Poll Winners (Riverside, 1960)
- The Cannonball Adderley Quintet at the Lighthouse (Riverside, 1960)
- The Cannonball Adderley Quintet Plus (Riverside, 1961)
- Live in Europe (Pablo, 1984)
- Paris 1960 (Fantasy, 1997)

With Nat Adderley

- A Little New York Midtown Music (Galaxy, 1978)

With Alessi Brothers

- Alessi (A&M Records, 1976)
- Long Time Friends (Qwest Records, 1982)

With Peter Allen

- I Could Have Been a Sailor (A&M Records, 1979)
- Not the Boy Next Door (Arista Records, 1983)

With Gregg Allman Band

- Playin' Up a Storm (Capricorn Records, 1977)

With Curtis Amy

- Way Down (Pacific Jazz, 1962)

With Patti Austin

- Patti Austin (Qwest Records, 1984)

With Hoyt Axton

- Southbound (A&M Records, 1975)

With The Beach Boys

- L.A. (Light Album) (CBS Records, 1979)

With The Beau Brummels

- The Beau Brummels (Warner Bros., 1975)

With Beaver & Krause

- All Good Men (Warner Bros., 1972)

With Bob Bennett

- Non-Fiction (Star Song, 1985)

With Stephen Bishop

- Careless (ABC Records, 1976)

With Bobby Bland

- Reflections in Blue (ABC Records, 1977)

With Blue Magic

- Message from the Magic (Atco, 1978)

With Karla Bonoff

- Wild Heart of the Young (Columbia Records, 1982)

With Terence Boylan

- Terence Boylan (Asylum, 1977)
- Suzy (Asylum, 1980)

With Teresa Brewer

- Music, Music, Music (Amsterdam, 1973)

With Toni Brown

- Toni Brown (Fantasy, 1980)

With Solomon Burke

- Electronic Magnetism (MGM Records, 1971)

With Kim Carnes

- St. Vincent's Court (EMI, 1979)

With Valerie Carter

- Wild Child (ARC, 1978)

With Johnny Cash

- John R. Cash (Columbia, 1975)

With David Cassidy

- Dreams Are Nuthin' More Than Wishes (Bell, 1973)

With Chad and Jeremy

- The Ark (Columbia, 1968)

With Kerry Chater

- Part Time Love (Warner Bros. Records, 1977)
- Love on a Shoestring (Warner Bros. Records, 1978)

With Cher

- I'd Rather Believe in You (Warner Bros. Records, 1976)
- Cher (Casablanca Records, 1979)
- Prisoner (Casablanca Records, 1979)

With James Clay

- A Double Dose of Soul (Riverside, 1960)

With Rita Coolidge

- Never Let You Go (A&M Records, 1983)

With Bob Cooper

- Coop! The Music of Bob Cooper (Contemporary, 1958)

With Jerry Corbetta

- Jerry Corbetta (Warner Bros. Records, 1978)

With Christopher Cross

- Christopher Cross (Warner Bros. Records, 1979)

With Dalbello

- Pretty Girls (Talisman, 1979)

With Miles Davis

- Seven Steps to Heaven (Columbia Records, 1963)

With Kiki Dee

- Stay with Me (Rocket, 1979)

With Buddy DeFranco

- Blues Bag (Vee-Jay, 1965)

With Jackie DeShannon

- New Arrangement (Columbia Records, 1975)

With Cliff DeYoung

- Cliff De Young (MCA, 1975)

With Neil Diamond

- Heartlight (Columbia Records, 1982)

With The 5th Dimension

- Love's Lines, Angles and Rhymes (Bell, 1971)

With Dion DiMucci

- Streetheart (Warner Bros. Records, 1976)

With Ned Doheny

- Hard Candy (Columbia, 1976)

With The Doobie Brothers

- Stampede (Warner Bros. Records, 1975)
- Livin' on the Fault Line (Warner Bros. Records, 1977)

With Charlie Dore

- Listen! (Chrysalis Records, 1981)

With Judith Durham

- Gift of Song (A&M, 1970)

With Billy Eckstine

- The Modern Sound of Mr. B (Mercury, 1964)

With Yvonne Elliman

- Yvonne (RSO Records, 1979)

With The Emotions

- Sunbeam (Columbia, 1978)

With Phil Everly

- Star Spangled Springer (RCA Records, 1973)

With The Everly Brothers

- The Everly Brothers Sing (Warner Bros. Records, 1967)

With José Feliciano

- Feliciano/10 to 23 (RCA Victor, 1969)
- Romance in the Night (Motown, 1983)

With The Floaters

- Float Into the Future (MCA Records, 1979)

With Four Tops

- Keeper of the Castle (Dunhill, 1972)
- Night Lights Harmony (ABC, 1975)

With Michael Franks

- Objects of Desire (Warner Bros. Records, 1982)

With The Free Movement

- I've Found Someone of My Own (Columbia Records, 1972)

With Glenn Frey

- The Allnighter (MCA Records, 1984)

With Richie Furay

- Dance a Little Light (Asylum Records, 1978)

With Ted Gärdestad

- Blue Virgin Isles (Polar, 1978)

With Terry Garthwaite

- Hand in Glove (Fantasy, 1978)

With Marvin Gaye

- Let's Get It On (Motown, 1973)

With Amy Grant

- A Christmas Album (Myrrh Records, 1983)

With Cyndi Grecco

- Making Our Dreams Come True (Private Stock Records, 1976)

With Lani Hall

- Blush (A&M, 1980)

With Albert Hammond

- Albert Hammond (Mums Records, 1974)

With Woody Herman

- At the Monterey Jazz Festival (Atlantic, 1959)

With Dan Hill

- If Dreams Had Wings (Epic Records, 1980)

With Paul Horn

- Impressions of Cleopatra (Columbia Records, 1963)

With Thelma Houston

- I've Got the Music in Me (Sheffield Lab Records, 1975)

With Paul Jabara

- Keeping Time (Casablanca, 1978)
- The Third Album (Casablanca, 1979)

With Milt Jackson

- Memphis Jackson (Impulse!, 1969)

With Al Jarreau

- Jarreau (Warner Bros. Records, 1983)

With Elton John

- 21 at 33 (Rocket, 1980)
- The Fox (Geffen, 1981)

With J. J. Johnson

- A Touch of Satin (Columbia Records, 1962)
- Concepts in Blue (Pablo, 1981)

With Plas Johnson

- This Must Be the Plas (Capitol Records, 1959)

With Jack Jones

- Harbour (RCA Victor, 1974)
- With One More Look at You (RCA Victor, 1977)

With Quincy Jones

- The Hot Rock OST (Prophesy, 1972)
- Roots (A&M Records, 1977)

With Rickie Lee Jones

- Rickie Lee Jones (Warner Bros. Records, 1979)
- Pirates (Warner Bros. Records, 1981)
- Girl at Her Volcano (Warner Bros. Records, 1983)
- The Magazine (Warner Bros. Records, 1984)

With Sam Jones

- The Chant (Riverside, 1961)

With Thomas Jefferson Kaye

- Thomas Jefferson Kaye (Dunhill Records, 1973)
- First Grade (Dunhill Records, 1974)

With The Keane Brothers

- The Keane Brothers (20th Century Records, 1977)

With Stan Kenton

- Hair (Capitol, 1969)

With Barney Kessel

- Carmen (Contemporary, 1958)
- Let's Cook! (Contemporary, 1962)

With B. B. King

- L.A. Midnight (ABC Records, 1972)

With Bobby King

- Bobby King (Warner Bros. Records, 1981)

With John Klemmer

- Waterfalls (Impulse!, 1972)
- Intensity (Impulse!, 1973)

With Gladys Knight

- Miss Gladys Knight (Buddah, 1978)

With Nicolette Larson

- Nicolette (Warner Bros. Records, 1978)
- In the Nick of Time (Warner Bros. Records, 1979)

With David Lasley

- Missin' Twenty Grand (EMI, 1982)

With Mark Lawrence

- David and Lisa and Jazz Impressions of "David & Lisa": Original Soundtrack (AVA Records, 1963) (With the Victor Feldman All-Stars, including Bob Whitlock, bass, and Colin Bailey, drums)

With Peggy Lee

- If You Go (Capitol, 1961)
- Then Was Then – Now Is Now! (Capitol, 1965)
- Make It With You (Capitol, 1970)
- Norma Deloris Egstrom from Jamestown, North Dakota (Capitol, 1972)
- Mirrors (A&M, 1975)

With Ketty Lester

- Ketty Lester (Records By Pete, 1969)

With Gordon Lightfoot

- Shadows (Warner Bros. Records, 1982)

With Lulu

- Lulu (Polydor Records, 1973)

With Mary MacGregor

- ...In Your Eyes (Ariola Records, 1978)

With Henry Mancini

- The Music from Peter Gunn (RCA Records, 1959)

With Harvey Mandel

- Righteous (Phillips, 1969)

With Shelly Manne

- Shelly Manne & His Men Play Peter Gunn (Contemporary, 1959)
- Son of Gunn!! (Contemporary, 1959)
- At the Black Hawk 1 (Contemporary, 1959)
- At the Black Hawk 2 (Contemporary, 1959)
- At the Black Hawk 3 (Contemporary, 1959)
- At the Black Hawk 4 (Contemporary, 1959)
- My Son the Jazz Drummer! (Contemporary, 1962)
- Daktari (Atlantic Records, 1967)
- At the Black Hawk 5 (Contemporary, 1991)

With Jon Mark

- Songs for a Friend (Columbia, 1975)

With Gene McDaniels

- Natural Juices (Ode, 1975)

With Bobby McFerrin

- Bobby McFerrin (Elektra Records, 1982)

With Kate & Anna McGarrigle

- Pronto Monto (Warner Bros. Records, 1978)

With Carmen McRae

- Can't Hide Love (Blue Note, 1976)

With Randy Meisner

- Randy Meisner (Asylum, 1978)

With Melanie

- Photograph (Atlantic Records, 1976)
- Seventh Wave (Neighbourhood Records, 1983)

With Jim Messina

- Messina (Warner Bros. Records, 1981)

With Stephanie Mills

- Merciless (Casablanca Records, 1983)

With Liza Minnelli

- Tropical Nights (Columbia, 1977)

With Adam Mitchell

- Redhead in Trouble (Warner Bros. Records, 1979)

With Blue Mitchell

- Stablemates (Candid Records, 1977)

With Joni Mitchell

- The Hissing of Summer Lawns (Asylum Records, 1975)
- Hejira (A&M Records, 1976)
- Wild Things Run Fast (Geffen, 1982)

With The Miracles

- City of Angels (Tamla, 1975)

With The Monkees

- Instant Replay (Colgems, 1969)

With Melba Moore

- Peach Melba (Buddah Records, 1975)

With Maria Muldaur

- Sweet Harmony (Reprise Records, 1976)
- Open Your Eyes (Warner Bros. Records, 1979)

With Michael Martin Murphey

- Flowing Free Forever (Epic Records, 1976)
- Lone Wolf (Epic Records, 1978)
- The Heart Never Lies (Liberty Records, 1983)

With Anne Murray

- Together (Capitol, 1975)
- Where Do You Go When You Dream (Capitol, 1981)

With Oliver Nelson

- Zig Zag (MGM, 1970)

With Michael Nesmith

- The Wichita Train Whistle Sings (Dot Records, 1968)

With Randy Newman

- Born Again (Warner Bros. Records, 1979)

With Olivia Newton-John

- Totally Hot (MCA Records, 1978)
- Physical (MCA Records, 1981)

With Wayne Newton

- Daddy Don't You Walk So Fast (Chelsea, 1972)
- While We're Still Young (Chelsea, 1973)
- She Believes in Me (Aries, 1979)

With Nielsen Pearson

- Nielsen/Pearson (Capitol, 1980)

With Kenny Nolan

- A Song Between Us (Polydor, 1978)

With Alan O'Day

- Appetizers (Pacific, 1977)
- Oh Johnny! (Pacific, 1979)

With Pages

- Pages (Epic, 1978)

With Freda Payne

- Out of Payne Comes Love (ABC, 1975)

With Leslie Pearl

- Words & Music (RCA Records, 1982)

With Art Pepper and Zoot Sims

- Art 'n' Zoot (Pablo, 1995)

With Esther Phillips

- All About Esther (Mercury Records, 1978)

With Sam Phillips

- Dancing with Danger (Myrrh Records, 1984)

With Poco

- Head over Heels (ABC, 1975)

With June Pointer

- Baby Sister (Planet Records, 1983)

With Jean-Luc Ponty and Frank Zappa

- King Kong: Jean-Luc Ponty Plays the Music of Frank Zappa (World Pacific Jazz, 1970)

With Billy Preston

- Pressin' On (Motown, 1982)

With Lou Rawls

- Love All Your Blues Away (Epic, 1986)

With Helen Reddy

- Music, Music (Capitol Records, 1976)

With Della Reese

- Della on Strings of Blue (ABC, 1967)
- I Gotta Be Me...This Trip Out (ABC, 1968)
- Let Me in Your Life (LMI, 1973)

With Minnie Riperton

- Minnie (Capitol Records, 1979)

With Rockie Robbins

- I Believe in Love (A&M Records, 1981)

With Kenny Rogers and Dolly Parton

- Once Upon a Christmas (RCA Records, 1984)

With Sonny Rollins

- Sonny Rollins and the Contemporary Leaders (Contemporary, 1958)

With Brenda Russell

- Brenda Russell (Horizon Records, 1979)

With Evie Sands

- Estate Of Mind (Haven Records, 1974)
- Suspended Animation (RCA Victor, 1979)

With Leo Sayer

- Here (Chrysalis Records, 1979)

With Boz Scaggs

- Down Two Then Left (Columbia Records, 1977)

With Lalo Schifrin

- Gone with the Wave (Colpix, 1964)
- The Cincinnati Kid (MGM, 1965)

With Seals and Crofts

- Seals & Crofts (TA Records, 1969)
- Year of Sunday (Warner Bros. Records, 1971)
- The Longest Road (Warner Bros. Records, 1980)

With Bud Shank

- Girl in Love (World Pacific, 1966)
- Bud Shank Plays Music from Today's Movies (World Pacific, 1967)
- Magical Mystery (World Pacific, 1967)

With Carly Simon

- Another Passenger (Elektra Records, 1976)

With Patrick Simmons

- Arcade (Elektra, 1983)

With Frank Sinatra

- Moonlight Sinatra (Reprise, 1965)
- Strangers in the Night (Reprise, 1966)
- That's Life (Reprise, 1966)
- Francis Albert Sinatra & Antônio Carlos Jobim (Reprise, 1967)
- Sinatra & Company (Reprise, 1971)

With The Singers Unlimited

- Feeling Free (Pausa, 1975)
- A Special Blend (MPS, 1976)

With O. C. Smith

- Together (Caribou, 1977)

With David Soul

- Band of Friends (Energy, 1979)

With Dusty Springfield

- Cameo (ABC Dunhill Records, 1973)

With Candi Staton

- Young Hearts Run Free (Warner Bros. Records, 1976)
- House of Love (Warner Bros. Records, 1978)

With Steely Dan

- Can't Buy a Thrill (ABC Records, 1972)
- Countdown to Ecstasy (ABC Records, 1973)
- Pretzel Logic (ABC Records, 1974)
- Katy Lied (ABC Records, 1975)
- The Royal Scam (ABC Records, 1976)
- Aja (ABC Records, 1977)
- FM (No Static at All) (MCA Records, 1978)
- Gaucho (MCA Records, 1980)

With Foster Sylvers

- Foster Sylvers (Capitol, 1978)

With The Sylvers

- New Horizons (Capitol, 1977)

With James Taylor

- Gorilla (Warner Bros. Records, 1975)
- In the Pocket (Warner Bros. Records, 1976)

With Livingston Taylor

- Man's Best Friend (Epic Records, 1980)

With Willie Tee

- Anticipation (United Artists Records, 1976)

With Three Dog Night

- Coming Down Your Way (ABC, 1975)

With Mel Tormé

- Back in Town (Verve, 1959)

With The Manhattan Transfer

- Pastiche (Atlantic, 1978)
- Mecca for Moderns (Atlantic, 1981)

With Gino Vannelli

- Brother to Brother (A&M Records, 1978)

With Leroy Vinnegar

- Leroy Walks! (Contemporary, 1958)
- Leroy Walks Again!! (Contemporary, 1963)

With Tom Waits

- Heartattack and Vine (Asylum Records, 1980)
- Swordfishtrombones (Island Records, 1983)

With Narada Michael Walden

- Awakening (Atlantic, 1979)

With Wendy Waldman

- The Main Refrain (Warner Bros. Records, 1976)

With Joe Walsh

- There Goes the Neighborhood (Asylum Records, 1981)

With Dionne Warwick

- Love at First Sight (Warner Bros. Records, 1977)
- Friends in Love (Arista Records, 1982)

With Wayne Watson

- Man in the Middle (Milk & Honey, 1984)

With Jimmy Webb

- Angel Heart (Real West Production, 1982)

With The Whispers

- Love Is Where You Find It (Solar, 1982)

With Deniece Williams

- Song Bird (Columbia Records, 1977)

With Joe Williams

- With Love (Temponic, 1972)

With Lenny Williams

- Taking Chances (MCA Records, 1981)

With Paul Williams

- Here Comes Inspiration (A&M, 1974)

With Gerald Wilson

- Feelin' Kinda Blues (Pacific Jazz, 1965)
- On Stage (Pacific Jazz, 1965)
- The Golden Sword (Pacific Jazz, 1966)

With Renn Woods

- Out of the Woods (Columbia, 1979)

With Betty Wright

- Betty Wright (Epic Records, 1981)

With The Youngbloods

- Elephant Mountain (RCA Victor, 1969)

With Frank Zappa

- Lumpy Gravy (Capitol Records, 1968)
