= Tito Burns =

English musician (1921–2010)

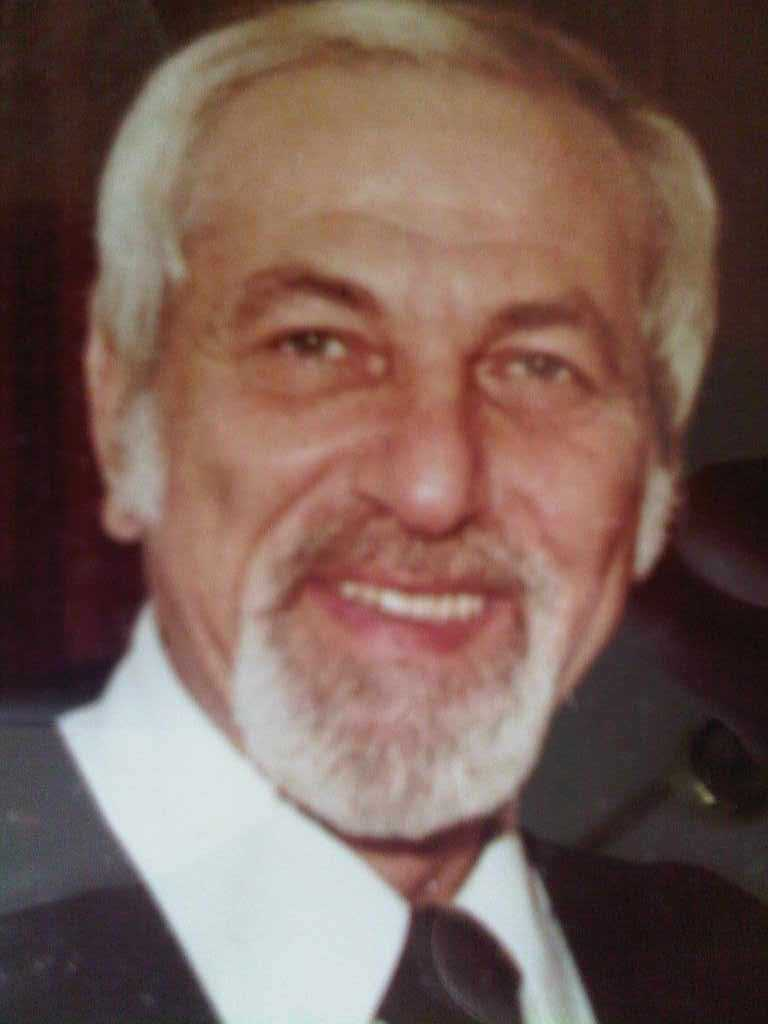
- Burns in 1980

Background information
- Born: Nathan Bernstein; 7 February 1921; London, England
- Died: 23 August 2010 (aged 89) London, England
- Genres: Jazz, be-bop
- Occupations: Bandleader, musician, talent manager

Tito Burns (born Nathan Bernstein; 7 February 1921 – 23 August 2010) was a British musician and impresario, who was active in both jazz and rock and roll.

== Biography ==
=== Early life ===
The son of a cabinet maker, he was the sixth and youngest child of Polish Orthodox Jewish immigrants who had settled in Bethnal Green. Burns was a self-taught accordionist from the age of 12, initially performing semi-professionally in the 1930s. From 16, he performed as a member of Don Marino Barreto and his Rumba Band, which had extended London residencies. It was as this time that he gained the "Tito" sobriquet which he retained for the rest of his life. He worked with the pianist Lou Preager and the clarinettist Carl Barriteau at the Cotton Club in Soho, with Burns doubling on piano. By 1941, he was leading a group at the Panama Club, but served in the Royal Air Force from 1942 becoming a member of the RAF Regiment Sextet the following year. He saw active service as a gunner in the Far East, but after VJ-Day, he worked in forces radio.

After demobilisation, his new group, the Tito Burns Septet, which was formed in January 1947 and disbanded in August 1955, its existence practically coinciding with the run of the BBC's Accordion Club radio series. The group is believed, partly on the account of musician Ronnie Scott, to have been the first band to perform the new jazz idiom bebop on BBC Radio in 1947. Their approach was derived from the "bop for the people" formula created by the American tenor saxophonist Charlie Ventura. When the show ended, the band went on tour and recorded a number of sides with various line-ups, including the pianist and trumpeter Dennis Rose, Scott and alto saxophonist Johnny Dankworth and drummer Tony Crombie. In 1949, they were recording as a septet, but went back to being a sextet shortly afterwards. Ultimately, Burns was unable to maintain a jazz idiom, and began to lean towards a pop-oriented repertoire.

=== Talent manager ===
From 1955, Burns's career switched to management and the emerging rock and roll, which he admitted to disliking. In 1959, he replaced Franklyn Boyd as manager for Cliff Richard. He soon gathered a list of clients, including The Searchers, whom he gave over to Brian Epstein. Among the new talents he discovered was singer Dusty Springfield. As an impresario, he first brought Cliff Richard to tailor Dougie Millings for a stage costume. The resulting outfit, with its unique style, was later emulated by other performers of the time.

Burns appeared in D. A. Pennebaker's documentary film Dont Look Back (1965) which documented Bob Dylan's first UK tour, which Burns promoted. He disapproved of what he saw on screen: "I wasn't doing anything unusual. All agents play the bouncing act. I was playing the BBC against Granada, but I didn't like seeing it on film. I thought that none of the TV producers would speak to me again." His agency was bought in 1966 for £250,000 by the Grade Organisation and Burns became the deputy managing director of Harold Davison Ltd, a Grade subsidiary.

Burns briefly left managing performers to become Head of Variety Programming in March 1968 at the soon to launch new ITV franchise holder London Weekend Television, with the head of light entertainment, Frank Muir, being his superior. He poached Simon Dee, then a high-profile host, from the BBC in October 1969, but Dee's eclipse under his new contract and LWT's early internal problems led Burns to resign by summer 1970.

In October 1971, he formed a new company, Scotia-Tito Burns with the Scotia leisure group, which supplemented representing performers with roles as music publisher, television production, film scorings and promoting concerts and their recording projects. Throughout his career, he promoted tours for many US entertainers in Europe including Simon and Garfunkel. He retired in 1976. However, he continued to book Tony Bennett and Sacha Distel for their British appearances, and remained Victor Borge's representative.

== Personal life ==
Burns married Teresa Devon, his longtime girlfriend, known as the singer Terry Devon, in 1948. The couple had two daughters.

== Death ==
Tito Burns died at home on 23 August 2010, of complications from prostate cancer, at the age of 89.
