= Lennie Bush =

English jazz double bassist (1927–2004)

- Born: Leonard Walter Bush; 6 June 1927; London, England
- Died: 15 June 2004 (aged 77) Long Melford, Suffolk
- Genres: Jazz; Bebop
- Occupation: Musician
- Instrument: Double Bass
- Years active: 1945-2004

Leonard Walter Bush (6 June 1927 – 15 June 2004) was an English jazz double bassist.

== Biography ==
Bush was born in London. He contracted polio as a child and had a limp for the rest of his life. He studied and played violin before switching to bass at 16 and was playing professionally by 17 in a variety show called The Rolling Stones and Dawn. He played with Nat Gonella in the middle of the 1940s but turned to bebop later in the decade. From 1950 onwards Lennie Bush performed a lot of freelance work and was with Roy Fox in 1951. He was one of the founding members of London's Club Eleven (this was the first London jazz club to offer performers a paid gig) and played there (1952-1956) in a band with Ronnie Scott, trumpeter Hank Shaw, pianist Tommy Pollard, and drummer Tony Crombie.

He studied with James Merrett at the Guildhall School of Music and participated in the European tours of Benny Goodman, Louis Armstrong, Zoot Sims, and Roy Eldridge. He became a member of Jack Parnell's ATV Orchestra in 1957 and recorded with Stephane Grappelli, Anita O'Day, and Eddie Vinson. He continued to play in the 1990s, notably as part of the Ralph Sharon trio with Jack Parnell. During that decade he also appeared with Don Lusher's Ted Heath tribute band and played in the final Ted Heath concert in 2000. He continued to freelance into the 2000s often playing gigs close to his home in East Anglia until his death in June 2004.

== Personal life ==
Bush and his wife Anne moved out of the London area during the late 1990s to Long Melford in Suffolk. At this point he was semi-retired although he continued to practise each day and post cassette tapes to friends containing music which he had discovered and was enthusiastic about. Bush died in Suffolk aged 77. He is survived by his wife Anne, a former journalist, and their son Andy, the trumpeter and composer.

== Discography ==
With Victor Feldman

- Suite Sixteen (Contemporary, 1955 [1958])
