= Hank Shaw =

Henry Shalofsky, better known as Hank Shaw (23 June 1926 – 26 October 2006) was an English bebop jazz trumpeter.

== Background ==
During his time, Shaw was a member of the Johnny Burch Octet.

== Career ==
Born in London, Shaw played with Teddy Foster's band during World War II at the age of 15. In the latter half of the decade he played in London with Oscar Rabin, Frank Weir, and Tommy Sampson, then switched permanently to playing bebop music in 1946 after hearing Dizzy Gillespie. He visited the United States in 1947 with close friend and fellow pioneer bebopper altoist Freddy Syer, then moved to Canada after he was unable to secure a work permit. There they played with Oscar Peterson and Maynard Ferguson before returning to England in 1948. He was one of the early Club Eleven players, along with Ronnie Scott, John Dankworth, Lennie Bush, and others; he also played with many of these musicians on the recordings of Alan Dean's Beboppers.

After Club Eleven shuttered, Shaw played with Vic Lewis and toured Europe with Cab Kaye, then joined Jack Parnell's ensemble in 1953 and Ronnie Scott's nonet in 1954. Shaw played regularly both live and as a session musician for many British jazz musicians over the course of the next twenty or so years, working with Joe Harriott, Tony Crombie, Don Rendell, Tony Kinsey, Stan Tracey, Bill Le Sage, and others. He led a quartet at the 100 Club in the 1960s, and played in the Bebop Preservation Society and the John Burch Quartet for over two decades each. He retired due to ill health in the late 1990s and died in Kent four months past his 80th birthday. His wife Jennifer of nearly 50 years survived him, dying in August 2007. Hank Shaw was survived by four of his five children; Lester, Howard, Naomi & Russell.

== Discography ==
- Bebop Preservation Society, Bebop Preservation Society (Dawn, 1971)
- John Dankworth, Full Circle (Philips, 1922)
- Joe Harriott, Southern Horizons (Jazzland, 1960)
- Jon Hendricks, Jon Hendricks Live (Fontana, 1970)
- Red Rodney, Red Rodney with the Bebop Preservation Society (Spotlite, 1981)
- Andrew Lloyd Webber and Tim Rice, Joseph and the Amazing Technicolor Dreamcoat (RSO, 1973)
- Kenny Wheeler, Windmill Tilter (Fontana, 1969)
