= Ronnie Scott =

British jazz saxophonist (1927–1996)

Ronnie Scott OBE

Background information
- Born: Ronald Schatt; 28 January 1927; Aldgate, London, England
- Died: 23 December 1996 (aged 69) London, England
- Genres: Jazz
- Occupations: Saxophonist; jazz club owner
- Instrument: Tenor saxophone

Ronnie Scott (born Ronald Schatt; 28 January 1927 – 23 December 1996) was a British jazz tenor saxophonist and jazz club owner. He co-founded Ronnie Scott's Jazz Club in London's Soho district in 1959.

== Life and career ==
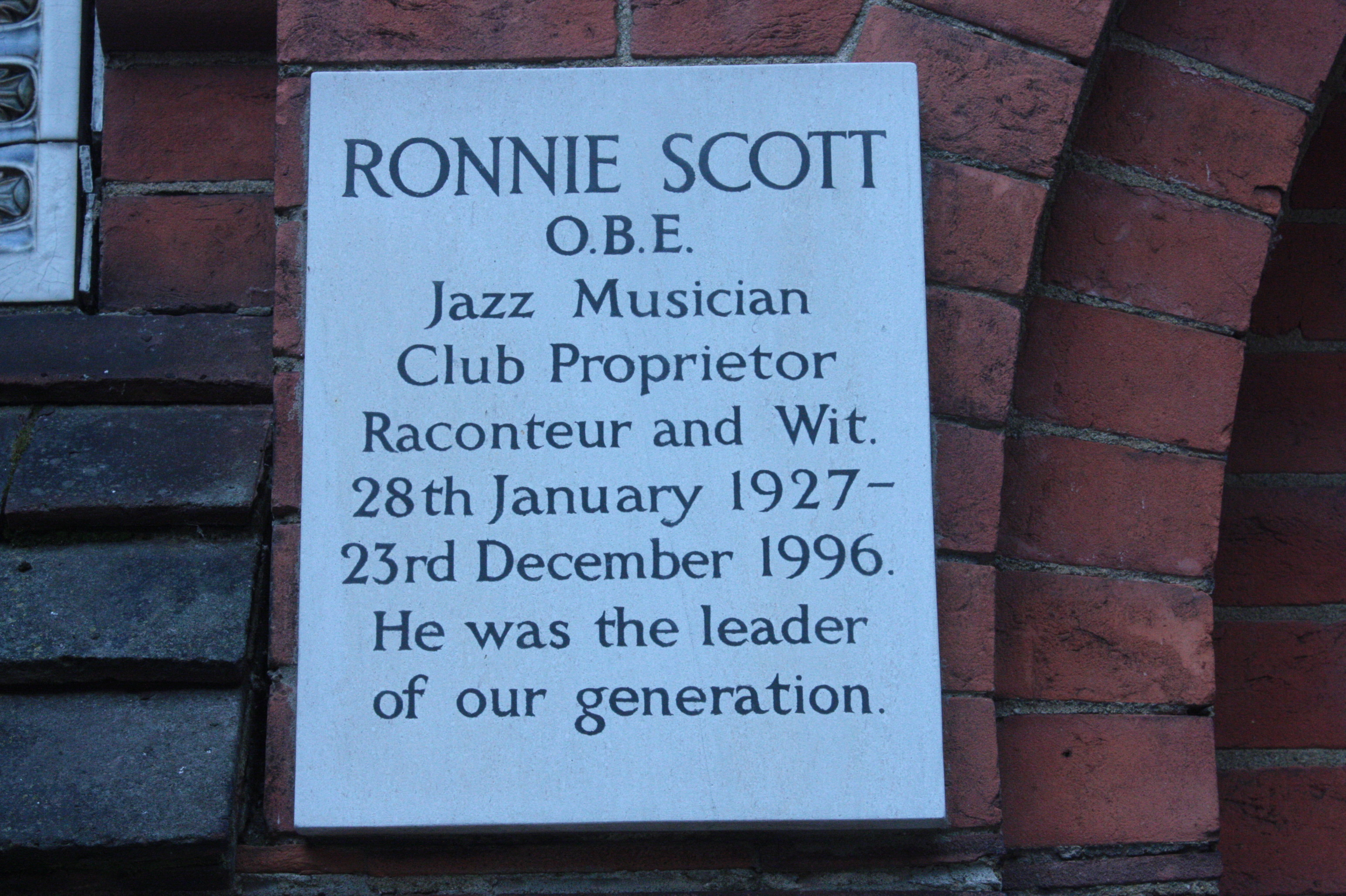
Memorial to Ronnie Scott, Golders Green Crematorium

Ronnie Scott was born in Aldgate, East London, into a Jewish family. His father, Joseph Schatt, was of Russian ancestry, and his mother Sylvia's family attended the Portuguese synagogue in Alie Street. Scott attended the Central Foundation Boys' School.

Scott began playing in small jazz clubs at the age of 16. He toured with trumpeter Johnny Claes from 1944 to 1945 and with Ted Heath in 1946. That same year, he appeared as one of the band members in George in Civvy Street. He worked with Ambrose, Cab Kaye, and Tito Burns. He was involved in the short-lived musicians' co-operative Club Eleven band and club (1948–50) with Johnny Dankworth. Scott became an acquaintance of the arranger/composer Tadd Dameron, when the American was working in the UK for Heath, and is reported to have performed with Dameron as the pianist, at one Club Eleven gig.

Scott was a member of the generation of British musicians who worked on the Cunard liner Queen Mary intermittently from 1946 to around 1950. The ship would sail to New York City where they were exposed to Bebop, the new form of jazz being played in the clubs there. Scott was among the earliest British musicians to have been influenced by Charlie Parker and other players of modern jazz.

In 1952, Scott joined Jack Parnell's orchestra and from 1953 to 1956 led a nine-piece band and quintet which included Pete King, with whom he later opened his jazz club, Victor Feldman, Hank Shaw, and Phil Seamen. He co-led The Jazz Couriers with Tubby Hayes from 1957 to 1959 and was leader of a quartet that included Stan Tracey (1960–67).

From 1967 to 1969, Scott was a member of the Kenny Clarke/Francy Boland Big Band, which toured Europe and included Johnny Griffin and Eddie "Lockjaw" Davis. Simultaneously he ran his octet, which included John Surman and Kenny Wheeler, and a trio with Mike Carr on keyboards and Bobby Gien on drums (1971–1975). Scott's other bands often included John Critchinson on keyboards and Martin Drew on drums. He did occasional session work, which included performing the solo on "Lady Madonna", the 1968 single by the Beatles, playing on Roy Budd's score for the film Fear Is the Key (1972), and performing the tenor sax solo on "I Missed Again", the 1981 single by Phil Collins.

In the 1981 New Year Honours, Scott was appointed an Officer of the Order of the British Empire (OBE) for services to jazz music.

Charles Mingus said of him in 1961, "Of the white boys, Ronnie Scott gets closer to the negro blues feeling, the way Zoot Sims does." Scott recorded infrequently during the last few decades of his career. He suffered from depression. While recovering from surgery for tooth implants, he died at the age of 69 from an accidental overdose of barbiturate prescribed by his dentist. The Westminster coroner's inquest in February 1997 recorded a verdict of 'death by misadventure'.

Ronnie Scott's widow, Mary Scott, and her daughter, Rebecca Scott, wrote the memoir A Fine Kind of Madness: Ronnie Scott Remembered, with a foreword by Spike Milligan. The book was published in 1999 in London by Headline Book Publishing.

== Ronnie Scott's Jazz Club ==
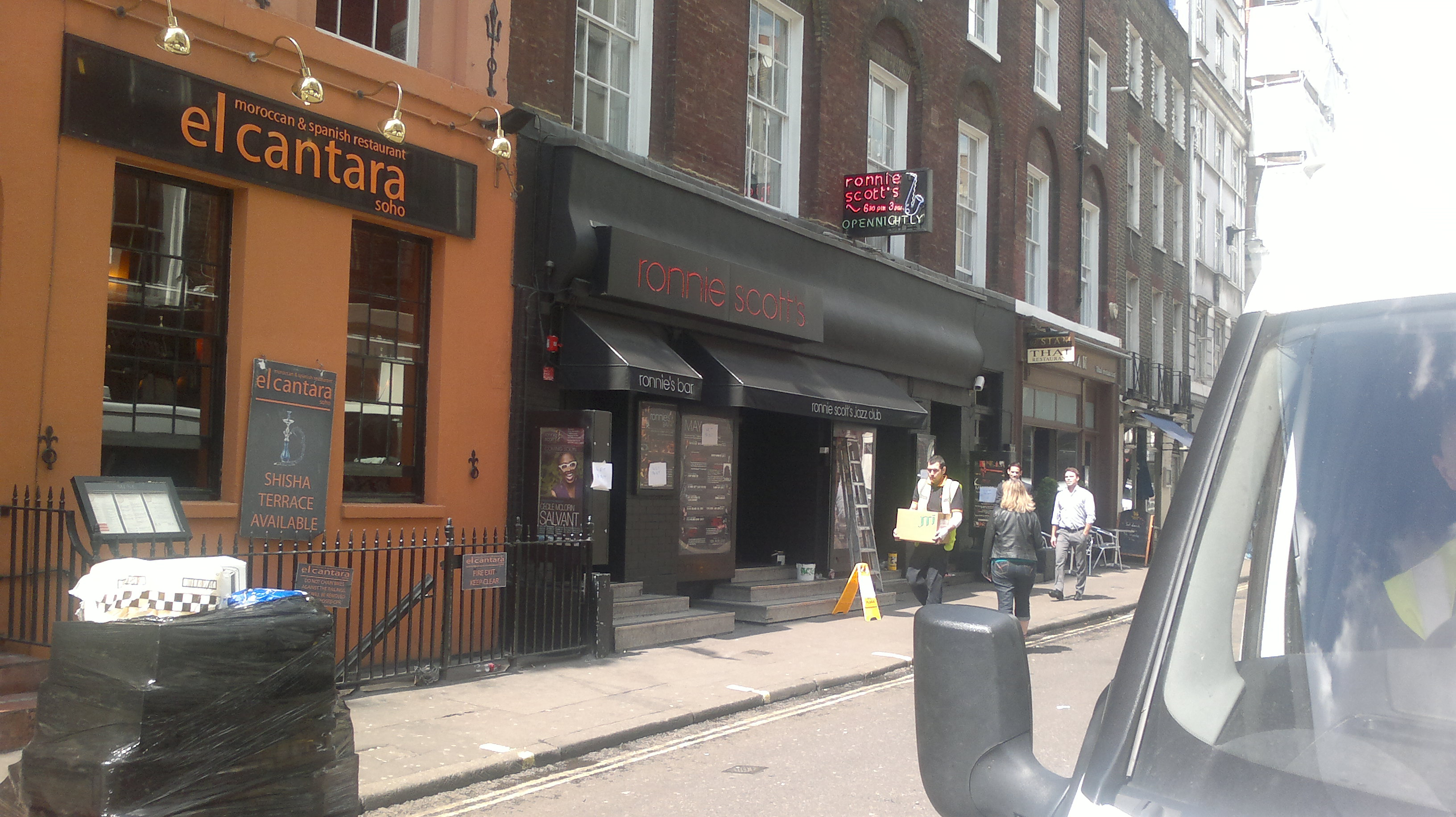
Ronnie Scott's Jazz Club at 47 Frith Street, Soho, London.

Scott is perhaps best remembered for co-founding, with former tenor sax player Pete King, Ronnie Scott's Jazz Club, which opened on 30 October 1959 in a basement at 39 Gerrard Street in London's Soho district, with the debut of a young alto sax player named Peter King (no relation), before later moving to a larger venue nearby at 47 Frith Street in 1965. The original venue continued in operation as the "Old Place" until the lease ran out in 1967, and was used for performances by the up-and-coming generation of domestic musicians.

Scott regularly acted as the club's genial master of ceremonies, and was noted for his repertoire of jokes, asides and one-liners. A typical introduction might go: "Our next guest is one of the finest musicians in the country. In the city, he's crap." Another memorable announcement was: "Next week we're proud to have a quartet featuring Stan Getz and violinist Stuff Smith. It's called the 'Getz-Stuffed quartet'." Ronnie often used in later days the services of John Schatt to book rock bands for Ronnie Scott's upstairs.

Ronnie Scott told Showbusiness journalist Don Short in 1970:

Pop has poached on jazz without apology. That may irritate many jazzmen, but not me. I would never lose any sleep over it. It’s for the fans to choose the music they want to hear. I play. I don’t attempt to convert. But many young people are discovering just how hip jazz is.

After Scott's death, King continued to run the club for a further nine years, before selling the club to theatre impresario Sally Greene in June 2005.

In September 2013, while the club was being redecorated, a 12-metre-square (39 ft^{2}) hoarding was placed on the Frith Street façade as a tribute to its eponymous founder, bearing a giant photograph of Ronnie Scott by Val Wilmer, alongside one of his one-liners: "I love this place, it's just like home, filthy and full of strangers."

== Selected band line-ups ==
As well as participating in name orchestras, Scott led or co-led numerous bands featuring some of Britain's most prominent jazz musicians of the day.

Alan Dean's Beboppers
1949
Ronnie Scott (tenor sax), Johnny Dankworth (alto sax), Hank Shaw (trumpet), Tommy Pollard (piano), Pete Chilver (guitar), Joe Mudele (double bass), Laurie Morgan (drums), Alan Dean (vocal)
Ronnie Scott Orchestra
– 1954, 1955
Ronnie Scott (tenor sax), Derek Humble (alto sax), Pete King (tenor sax), Hank Shaw (trumpet), Ken Wray (trombone), Benny Green (baritone sax), Victor Feldman (piano), Lennie Bush (double bass), Phil Seamen (drums)
Ronnie Scott Quintet
– 1955
Ronnie Scott (tenor sax), Hank Shaw (trumpet), Victor Feldman (piano), Sammy Stokes (double bass), Lennie Bush (double bass), Phil Seamen (drums)
Ronnie Scott Big Band
– 1955
Ronnie Scott, Pete King (tenor sax); Joe Harriott, Doug Robinson (alto sax); Benny Green (baritone sax); Stan Palmer, Hank Shaw, Dave Usden, Jimmy Watson (trumpet); Jack Botterill, Robin Kaye, Mac Minshull, Ken Wray (trombone); Norman Stenfalt (piano); Eric Peter (double bass); Phil Seamen (drums)
The Jazz Couriers

On 7 April 1957, The Jazz Couriers, co-led by Tubby Hayes and Ronnie Scott, debuted at the new Flamingo Club in Wardour Street, Soho. The group lasted until 30 August 1959.

Ronnie Scott (tenor sax), Tubby Hayes (tenor sax, vibraphone), Terry Shannon (piano), Phil Bates (double bass), Bill Eyden (drums)
Ronnie Scott Quartet
1964
Ronnie Scott (tenor sax), Stan Tracey (piano), Malcolm Cecil (double bass), Jackie Dougan (drums)
Ronnie Scott Trio
1970
Ronnie Scott (tenor sax), Mike Carr (keyboards, vibraphone), Tony Crombie (drums, piano)
Ronnie Scott Quintet
1990
Ronnie Scott (tenor sax), Dick Pearce (trumpet), John Critchinson (piano), Ron Mathewson (double bass), Martin Drew (drums)

== Discography ==
=== As leader ===
- Boppin' at Esquire (Esquire, 1948)[10"]
- The Couriers of Jazz! (Carlton, 1958)
- The Night Is Scott and You're So Swingable (1965, Redial)
- When I Want Your Opinion, I'll Give it to You (Jazz House, 1965)
- Live at Ronnie Scott's (Columbia, 1969)
- ‘’The Pablo All-Stars Jam’’ (Pablo, 1977)
- Serious Gold (Pye, 1977)
- Never Pat a Burning Dog (Jazz House, 1990)
- If I Want Your Opinion (Jazz House, 1997)
- The Night Has a Thousand Eyes (Jazz House, 1997)
- Boppin' at Esquire (Indigo, 2000)
- Ronnie Scott Live at the Jazz Club (Time Music, 2002)

=== As sideman ===
With the Kenny Clarke/Francy Boland Big Band

- Handle with Care (Atlantic, 1963)
- Now Hear Our Meanin' (Columbia, 1965) – rec. 1963
- Sax No End (SABA, 1967)
- Out of the Folk Bag (Columbia, 1967)
- 17 Men and Their Music (Campi, 1967)
- All Smiles (MPS, 1968)
- Faces (MPS, 1969)
- Latin Kaleidoscope (MPS, 1968)
- Fellini 712 (MPS, 1969)
- All Blues (MPS, 1969)
- More Smiles (MPS, 1969)
- Clarke Boland Big Band en Concert avec Europe 1 (Tréma, 1992) – rec. 1969
- Off Limits (Polydor, 1970)
- November Girl (Black Lion, 1975) – rec. 1970. also with Carmen McRae.
- Change of Scenes (Verve, 1971) – also with Stan Getz

With others

- Victor Feldman, Suite Sixteen (Contemporary, 1958) – rec. 1955
- Phil Collins, Face Value (Virgin, 1981) Tenor saxophone solo on "I Missed Again"
- The Beatles, Lady Madonna (1968) tenor saxophone solo
- Mark Murphy, Midnight Mood (MPS, 1968)

== See also ==
- List of jazz clubs

== Bibliography ==
- Clarke, Donald (ed.), The Penguin Encyclopedia of Popular Music, Viking, 1989.
- Kernfeld, Barry Dean (ed.), The New Grove Dictionary of Jazz, Macmillan Press, 1988.
- Kington, Miles; Gelly, Dave, The Giants of Jazz, Schirmer Books, 1986.
- Larkin, Colin, The Encyclopedia of Popular Music, 3rd edition, Macmillan, 1998.
- Ruppli, Michel; Novitsky, Ed, The Mercury Labels. A discography, Vol. V., Record and Artist Indexes, Greenwood Press, 1993.
- Ronnie Scott with Mike Hennessey, Some of My Best Friends are Blues (autobiography). London: Northway Books, 2002. ISBN 978-0-9550908-3-7
- Ronnie Scott's Jazz Farrago compilation of best features from Jazz at Ronnie Scott′s magazine, Hampstead Press, 2008, ISBN 978-0-9557628-0-2
- Ian Carr, Digby Fairweather & Brian Priestley, Jazz: The Rough Guide. ISBN 1-85828-528-3
- Richard Cook & Brian Morton, The Penguin Guide to Jazz on CD 6th edition. ISBN 0-14-051521-6
