= Tony Crombie =

English musician (1925–1999)

- Born: Anthony John Kronenberg; 27 August 1925; Bishopsgate, London, England
- Died: 18 October 1999 (aged 74) Hampstead, London
- Genre: Jazz
- Occupation: Musician
- Instrument: Drums

Anthony John Crombie (né Kronenberg; 27 August 1925 – 18 October 1999), was an English jazz drummer, pianist, bandleader, and composer. He was regarded as one of the finest English jazz drummers and bandleaders, an occasional but capable pianist and vibraphonist, and an energising influence on the British jazz scene over six decades.

== Life and career ==
Born into London's East End Jewish community, Crombie was a self-taught musician who began playing the drums at the age of fourteen. He was one of a group of young men from the East End of London who ultimately formed the co-operative Club Eleven, bringing modern jazz to Britain. Having gone to New York with his friend Ronnie Scott in 1947, witnessing the playing of Charlie Parker and Dizzy Gillespie, he and like-minded musicians such as Johnny Dankworth, and Scott and Denis Rose, brought be-bop to the UK. This group of musicians were the ones called upon if and when modern jazz gigs were available.

In 1948, Crombie toured Britain and Europe with Duke Ellington, who had been unable to bring his own musicians with him, except for Ray Nance and Kay Davis. Picking up a rhythm section in London, he chose Crombie on the recommendation of Lena Horne, with whom Crombie had worked when she appeared at the Palladium.

In August 1956, Crombie set up a rock and roll band he called The Rockets, which included future Shadows bassist Jet Harris. The group was modelled after Bill Haley's Comets and Freddie Bell & the Bellboys. Crombie and his Rockets released several singles for Decca and Columbia, including "Teach You to Rock", produced by Norrie Paramor, which made the Top 30 in the UK Singles Chart in October 1956.

He is credited with introducing rock and roll music to Iceland, performing there in May 1957. By 1958 the Rockets had become a jazz group with Scott and Tubby Hayes. During the following year, Crombie started Jazz Inc. with pianist Stan Tracey. In 1960, he scored the NBC TV series Man from Interpol and composed the score for the film The Tell-Tale Heart, and established a residency at a hotel in Monte Carlo. In May 1960, he toured the UK with Gene Vincent, Conway Twitty, Freddy Cannon, Johnny Preston, and Wee Willie Harris.

In the early 1960s, Crombie's friend, Victor Feldman, passed one of his compositions to Miles Davis, who recorded the piece on his album Seven Steps to Heaven. The song, "So Near, So Far", has been recorded by players including Joe Henderson, who named a tribute album to Miles Davis using the title.

Over the next thirty years, Crombie worked with many American jazz musicians, including Ben Webster, Coleman Hawkins, Illinois Jacquet, Joe Pass, Mark Murphy and Eddie "Lockjaw" Davis.

In the mid-1990s, after breaking his arm in a fall, he stopped playing the drums, but continued composing until his death in 1999, aged 74.

Crombie was married twice. He had a son and daughter from his first marriage and another daughter from his second. One of his grandsons is the drummer, music producer and composer, Dylan Freed.

== Discography ==
=== As leader ===
- Tony Crombie and His Orchestra – 30 October 1954 (Decca) with Dizzy Reece, Les Condon, Joe Temperley, Sammy Walker, Lennie Dawes, Harry South, Ashley Kozak, Tony Crombie. (Re-released as Modern Jazz at the Festival Hall, 1954)
- Tony Crombie and His Orchestra – 18 November 1954 (Decca DFE6247) with Dizzy Reece, Les Condon, Joe Temperley, Sammy Walker, Lennie Dawes, Harry South, Ashley Kozak, Tony Crombie. "Perdido"/"Stop It"/"Love You Madly" (vocal Annie Ross) "All of Me" (vocal Bobby Breen).
- Rockin' with the Rockets – 1958 (Columbia) – Tony Crombie and His Rockets (Red Morris, Jimmy Currie, Ashley Kozak, Red Mitchell, Clyde Ray)
- Atmosphere – 1959 (Columbia) – Tony Crombie and His Men (Stan Roderick, Les Condon, Bob Burns, Ronnie Scott, Tubby Hayes, Norman Stenfalt, Lennie Bush)

=== As sideman ===
With Don Byas

- Autumn Leaves (Jazz House, 1965)

With Al Cohn and Zoot Sims

- Al And Zoot In London (World Record Club, 1965)

With Victor Feldman

- Suite Sixteen (Contemporary, 1955 [1958])

With Stan Getz

- Live in London (Harkit, 1964)

With Johnny Griffin

- Live in London (Harkit, 1963)

With Wes Montgomery

- Wes Montgomery Quartet (SSJ (Japan), 1965)

With Zoot Sims

- Zoot At Ronnie Scott's (Fontana, 1961)

With Ben Webster

- Ben Webster At Ronnie Scott's 1964 - The Punch/Ben Webster Plays Ballads (Soryville, 1964)
- Soho Nights With Stan Tracey - Vol. 2 (ReSteamed, 1964)

== Selected filmography ==
- Rock You Sinners (1957)
- Date at Midnight (1959)
- Man from Interpol (1960)
- Identity Unknown (1960)
- The Spider's Web (1960)
- The Tell-Tale Heart (1960)
