= British jazz =

Music genre

British jazz is a form of music derived from jazz. It reached Britain through recordings and performers who visited the country while it was a relatively new genre, soon after the end of World War I. Jazz began to be played by British musicians from the 1930s and on a widespread basis in the 1940s, often within dance bands. From the late 1940s, British "modern jazz", highly influenced by American bebop, began to emerge and was led by figures such as Sir John Dankworth, Tony Crombie and Ronnie Scott, while Ken Colyer, George Webb and Humphrey Lyttelton played Dixieland-style trad jazz. From the 1960s British jazz began to develop more individual characteristics and absorb a variety of influences, including British blues, as well as European and world music influences. A number of British jazz musicians have gained international reputations, although the music has remained a minority interest there.

== History ==
=== Early 20th century ===
London, which long has sworn to shake off the fever, but still is jazzing

— The New York Times, 1922

Jazz in Britain is usually said to have begun with the British tour of the Original Dixieland Jazz Band in 1919. That stated, British popular music aficionados in the 1920s generally preferred the terms "hot" or "straight" dance music to the term "jazz". Jazz in Britain also faced a similar difficulty to Brazilian jazz and French jazz, namely it tended to be seen by figures of authority as a bad influence, but in Britain the concern that jazz was from the United States appears to have been less important than in France or Brazil. Instead those who objected to it did so more because they deemed it "riotous" or unnerving. One of the earliest popular jazz dance bands was that of Fred Elizalde, who broadcast on the BBC from 1926 to 1929.

By the early 1930s, music journalism in Britain, notably through the Melody Maker, had created an appreciation of the importance of the leading American jazz soloists and was beginning to recognise the improvising talents of some local musicians. During the 1930s, most British jazz musicians made their living in dance bands of various kinds. Jazz became more important, and more separate as its own genre. Louis Armstrong played residencies in London and Glasgow in 1932, followed in subsequent years by the Duke Ellington Orchestra and Coleman Hawkins. But local jazz culture was limited to London where: "jazz was played after hours in a couple of restaurants that encouraged musicians to come in and jam for drinks". The groups of Nat Gonella and Spike Hughes gained a profile within Britain early in the decade; Hughes was even invited to New York to arrange, compose and lead what, in effect, was Benny Carter's Orchestra of the time. Carter himself worked in London for the BBC in 1936. West Indian swing band leader Ken "Snakehips" Johnson and Leslie Thompson, a Jamaican trumpeter, influenced jazz in Britain, with the band fronted by Johnson – "The Emperors of Jazz" – being the first large Black band of note. Johnson went on to form one of the top swing bands in the country, known as "The West Indian Orchestra", which became the resident band at fashionable London venue Café de Paris, and it was here that Johnson was among those killed by a German bomb during the Blitz in the early days of the war.

=== 1930s ===
The music of the pre-war jazz age became a major form of popular music via dance bands, and this was due to an earlier influx of Caribbean jazz musicians who had enriched the British swing scene. Significant pre-war jazz and swing artists included Coleridge Goode and Ken "Snakehips" Johnson, a leading London figure who was killed by a bomb at the Café de Paris, London, in March 1941 during the Blitz, and trumpeter, Leslie Thompson.

=== 1940s and 1950s ===
World War II led to an increase in bands to entertain the troops and these bands began to refer to themselves as "jazz" groups more often. The period also saw an increased interest in American musicians who also toured in military bands. The future leading alto-saxophonist Art Pepper was among the visiting American musicians at this time.

Caribbean ex-servicemen and women who had volunteered in World War II, embraced listening to jazz and bebop music, with some forming their own quartets playing jazz including tenor saxophonist, Winston Whyte. In London, there were many black jazz musicians playing in popular nightclubs around Albemarle Street in central London. Notable nightclubs and dancehalls in London included the Shim Sham, Hippodrome, the Q club, and Wiskey-A-Gogo (W.A.G club). Black jazz artists in Britain were paid lower than their white counterparts, and so some artists would arrange and sell compositions to white artists who would release them under their own name.

In Britain, jazz was developing in quite unique ways and the following period saw the emergence of a consciously black and proud British jazz. Up until the 1950s, industrial action by the musicians' unions on both sides of the Atlantic made it difficult for musicians from the United States to perform in Britain. "There was a hole that needed to be filled and black British jazz evolved to fill that void," says Catherine Tackley of the Open University.

In 1948, a group of young musicians including John Dankworth and Ronnie Scott, focused on the Club Eleven in London, began a movement toward "modern jazz" or bebop. Significant instrumentalists in this early movement were trumpeter-pianist Denis Rose, pianist Tommy Pollard, saxophonist Don Rendell, and drummers Tony Kinsey and Laurie Morgan. A movement in an opposite direction was revivalism, which became popular in the 1950s and was represented by musicians like George Webb, Humphrey Lyttelton and Ken Colyer, although Lyttelton gradually became more catholic in his approach. Trad jazz, a variant, briefly entered the pop charts later. At this point both streams tended to emulate Americans, whether it be Charlie Parker for Beboppers or Joe "King" Oliver and other New Orleans musicians for traditionalists, rather than try to create a uniquely British form of jazz.

During the 1950s, mass emigration into the UK brought an influx of players from the Caribbean such as Joe Harriott and Harold McNair, though some, among them Dizzy Reece, found the shortage of genuine jazz work frustrating - dance music remained popular - and migrated to the United States. British-born players too, including George Shearing, active on the London scene since before the war, and Victor Feldman also chose to move across the Atlantic to develop their careers. Several new jazz clubs were established in London in the 1950s, including the Flamingo Club.

A domestic musicians' union ban, with the agreement of the Ministry of Labour, was initiated in the mid-thirties on visiting American jazz musicians, following successful visits from Louis Armstrong, Cab Calloway and Duke Ellington. Appearances from across the Atlantic virtually ceased for 20 years. Despite this, Fats Waller was able to visit the UK as a solo 'variety' act in 1938. Lyttelton illegally evaded the ban by playing and recording in London with Sidney Bechet (supposedly on "holiday") in November 1949. The erratic availability of American records meant that, unlike the rest of Europe, British jazz aficionados had become unfamiliar with the most recent jazz developments in the music's country of origin. The restriction was gradually relaxed from the mid-fifties onwards with musician exchanges.

Ronnie Scott's Jazz Club in London, co-founded in 1959 by one of the earliest native proponents of bebop, was able to benefit from an exchange arrangement with the American Federation of Musicians (AFM), allowing regular visits from leading American players from 1961. Stan Tracey, developed his skills backing the visiting musicians as house pianist at Scott's club. In 1959, the Chris Barber Jazz Band scored a hit with a version of Sidney Bechet's "Petite Fleur" on both the US Billboard and UK singles charts (No. 5 and No. 3, respectively).

=== 1960s and 1970s ===
In the 1960s and 1970s, British jazz began to have more varied influences, from Africa and the Caribbean. The influx of musicians from the Caribbean brought to the UK shores excellent musicians, including the Jamaican saxophonist Joe Harriott. Firmly established as an outstanding bebop soloist before his arrival in the UK he went on to claim a leading spot in British jazz. Harriott was an important voice and innovator whose constant search for new ways to express his music was to lead to collaborations with fellow Jamaican Alpha Boys School alumnus trumpeter Dizzy Reece and St Vincent trumpeter Shake Keane. Harriott turned to what he termed "abstract" or "free form" music. He had been toying with some loose free form ideas since the mid-1950s, but finally settled upon his conception in 1959, after a protracted spell in hospital with tuberculosis gave him time to think things over. At first he struggled to recruit other like-minded musicians to his vision. Indeed, two of his core band members, Harry South and Hank Shaw, left when these ideas surfaced. He finally settled on a line-up of Keane (trumpet, flugelhorn), Pat Smythe (piano), Coleridge Goode (bass) and Phil Seamen (drums). Les Condon temporarily replaced Keane on trumpet in 1961, while Seamen left permanently the same year, his place taken by the return of the quintet's previous drummer, Bobby Orr. Harriot's subsequent groundbreaking album Free Form was released in early 1960, historically prior to celebrated American saxophonist Ornette Coleman's own experimental Free Jazz album. Harriott's free form music is often compared to Ornette Coleman's roughly contemporary breakthrough in the US, but even cursory listening reveals deep divisions between their conceptions of "free jazz". Indeed, there were several distinctive models of early free jazz, from Cecil Taylor to Sun Ra. Harriott's was another of these. His method demanded more complete group improvisation than displayed in Coleman's music, and often featured no particular soloist. Instead of the steady pulse of Ornette's drummer and bass player, Harriott's model demanded constant dialogue between musicians which created an ever-shifting soundscape. Tempo, key and meter always free to alter in this music, and often did so. The presence of Bill Evans-inspired pianist Pat Smythe, also gave the band a completely different texture to Coleman's, which by then had dispensed with the need for a pianist.

Harriott was always keen to communicate his ideas, be it on stage, in interviews or album liner notes. In 1962, he wrote in the liner notes for his Abstract album, "of the various components comprising jazz today - constant time signatures, a steady four-four tempo, themes and predictable harmonic variations, fixed division of the chorus by bar lines and so on, we aim to retain at least one in each piece. But we may well, if the mood seems to us to demand it, dispense with all the others".

He recorded three albums in this vein: Free Form (Jazzland 1960), Abstract (Columbia (UK) 1962) and Movement (Columbia (UK) 1963). Abstract received a five-star review from Harvey Pekar in Down Beat, the first such honour for a British jazz record. Free Form and Abstract together formed a pair of cohesive, trailblazing free jazz sessions. The next album, Movement, featured some of his most fiercely abstract compositions, but these were tempered by some other, more straight ahead pieces.

In 1962, Kenny Ball and His Jazzmen got US hit "Midnight in Moscow". One important aspect was the South African jazz musicians who had left their home nation, including Chris McGregor, Dudu Pukwana, Mongezi Feza, Johnny Dyani, Harry Miller and later Julian Bahula. This period also spawned many other "Trad" jazz bands in and around London, including the Tranquil Valley Stompers, who played at various jazz clubs and coffee bars.

There was also a growth in free jazz inspired by European models more than from American music. It helped to influence the development of a strong European identity in this field. South African and free jazz influences came together in projects like the Brotherhood of Breath big band, led by McGregor. Added to this, more musicians had been raised on rhythm and blues or English forms of rock and roll, which became increasingly significant to the genre. These influences mixed in a way that led to British contemporary jazz of the time developing a distinctive identity distancing it to some extent from American styles. Highly original jazz composers such as Mike Westbrook, Graham Collier, Michael Garrick and Mike Gibbs began to make major contributions during the period and after. The local scene was not unaffected by, what elsewhere came to be known as, the British Invasion; the jazz audience was in numerical decline at this time. One branch of this development was the creation of various British jazz fusion bands like Soft Machine, Nucleus, Colosseum, If, Henry Cow, Centipede, National Health, Ginger Baker's Air Force, to name a few. Some of the most significant musicians to emerge during this period include John McLaughlin and Dave Holland (both of whom joined Miles Davis's group), pianists Keith Tippett and John Taylor, saxophonists Evan Parker, Mike Osborne, John Surman and Alan Skidmore, and the Canadian-born trumpeter Kenny Wheeler who had settled in Britain.

The Jazz Centre Society was founded in 1969 to develop a national centre for jazz in London and efforts to secure and fund premises for the centre continued until 1984; the JCS's many jazz promoting activities in London, Manchester, the Midlands and elsewhere survive as Jazz Services Ltd. Similar promotional organisations such as Platform Jazz in Scotland were formed in the 1970s to widen opportunities to hear and play jazz. The music continued to be presented in a wide range of venues in major British cities, but with most activity still focused in London. A National Jazz Archive was set up with its base at Loughton Library in Essex. Today it is the main location for jazz documentation in Britain, with rapidly expanding collections. John Keating's wife Thelma Keating recorded John Barry's song "Follow Me" in 1972.

=== 1980s to the present ===
The 1980s saw a continuing development of distinctive styles. There was a new generation of Black British musicians who helped to re-energise the UK jazz scene, with Courtney Pine, Ronny Jordan, Gary Crosby, Julian Joseph, Cleveland Watkiss, Steve Williamson, Orphy Robinson, and later Denys Baptiste, Soweto Kinch and Jason Yarde being noteworthy examples (many of these musicians have recorded albums on historical labels such as Verve, Blue Note and are musicians who are highly regarded on the international scene. They were also members of the ground-breaking Black British big band Jazz Warriors). Loose Tubes was also very important group in re-energising the British scene. Many musicians from this band, including Django Bates, Iain Ballamy and Julian Argüelles, have also become important artists with highly developed individual musical voices. Early 1990s, acid jazz group such as Incognito and Brand New Heavies were popular.

The expansion of jazz was also marked by the launch of Jazz FM in 1990 and the opening of The Jazz Café, based in Camden Town, London. Both of these gradually ceased to concern themselves primarily with jazz and the radio station was renamed Smooth FM in 2005. A new national digital jazz radio station The Jazz began operations at Christmas 2006, dedicated to broadcasting jazz in most styles, but was closed by its parent company in February 2008. However, new venues continue to open.

In the early 2000s, the F-IRE Collective gained significant attention with Polar Bear and Ben Davis receiving Mercury Prize nominations.

In recent years, funk and hip hop have become an influence on parts of Britain's jazz scene. At the same time, Black British traditions in jazz have been strengthened, in part, by the "rediscovery" and celebration in the 2000s of Jamaican altoist Joe Harriott's once-neglected music and by the publication of books about him and his close collaborator, bassist Coleridge Goode. The effect has been to make Harriott, posthumously, a powerful symbol of Black British jazz achievement and identity. A new generation of electro-jazz artists such as K.T. Reeder have sought to redefine Jazz through using advanced computer software and acoustic instruments.

There are more opportunities now for students to specialise in jazz whether at basic learner level or at major conservatoires around the country, such as the Royal Academy of Music, Guildhall School of Music, Trinity College of Music and Middlesex University in London, Birmingham Conservatoire and Leeds College of Music. Jazz music education and artist development is also undertaken by organisations including The Jazz Centre UK, The National Youth Jazz Orchestra and Tomorrow's Warriors (founded in 1991 by Janine Irons and Gary Crosby, with alumni going on to win several awards.).

In 2023, the Mercury Prize, the annual music prize awarded for the best album released by a musical act from the United Kingdom or Ireland, was awarded to Ezra Collective, a British jazz quintet.

== British jazz organisations ==
The National Jazz Archive is the UK's primary archive of printed materials, audio recordings, and unpublished papers related to the history of jazz and related music in Britain and beyond. Founded in 1988, it's UK headquarters is based at Loughton Library, Loughton, Essex, has a regional base at Birmingham City University in tbe West Midlands alongside the Royal Birmingham Conservatoire'Jazz School, it holds more than 10000 books, over 12,000 jazz photographs and approximately 1000 jazz journals and periodicals including original copies of renowned music newspaper Melody Maker as well as drawings, paintings, concert and festival posters and programmes and original sound recordings of selected jazz assets of heritage value.

Also included are instruments letters, memorabilia and personal papers and artifacts and ephemera donated by musicians, writers, journalists and collectors.

Many of these artifacts are displayed on rotation in the NJA's independent museum cultural hub and pre-loved jazz retail outlet THE JAZZ HUB alao based at Loughton Library.

Among The NJA's special collections are the papers of Mike Westbrook, John Chilton, Jim Godbolt and Charles Fox.

The Jazz Centre UK is another charity, originally established following plans to operate as a branch of the National Jazz Arch in the UK which holds a collection of books and other publications on long-term loan from the National Jazz Archive with the aim to establish national representation of the art form. Prior to The Jazz Centre UK only one unsuccessful attempt to establish such a centre had been launched in 1982 when plans were laid by the (then) ‘Jazz Centre Society’ to establish a National Jazz Centre in London's Floral Street, Covent Garden. However, the project collapsed four years later in 1986 due to funding problems.

The Jazz Centre (UK) was officially launched thirty years later and registered as a standalone charity operating separately (apart from the pre-agreed loan collection), from the National Jazz Archive on 2 June 2016 with the aim to preserve promote and celebrate the art of jazz music in all its forms.

== Bibliography ==
- Ron Brown with Digby Fairweather (2005), Nat Gonella: A Life in Jazz. London: Northway. ISBN 0-9537040-7-6.
- Ian Carr (2008), Music Outside: Contemporary Jazz in Britain. 2nd ed. London: Northway. ISBN 978-0-9550908-6-8
- John Chilton (2004), Who's Who of British Jazz. 2nd ed. London: Continuum. ISBN 0-8264-7234-6
- Roger Cotterrell (ed.) (1976), Jazz Now: The Jazz Centre Society Guide. London: Quartet. ISBN 0-7043-3097-0
- Roger Cotterrell,'Postscript: Thirty Years On', in Ian Carr, Music Outside: Contemporary Jazz in Britain, 2nd edn. London: Northway, 2008, 163–80.
- Digby Fairweather (2002), Notes from a Jazz Life. London: Northway. ISBN 0-9537040-1-7
- Michael Garrick (2010), Dusk Fire: Jazz in English Hands. Earley: Springdale Publishing. ISBN 978-0-9564353-0-9
- Dave Gelly (2014), An Unholy Row: Jazz in Britain and its Audience, 1945–1960. London: Equinox Publishing. ISBN 978-17817915-3-0
- Jim Godbolt (2005), A History of Jazz in Britain, 1919 – 50. Revised edn. London: Northway. ISBN 0-9537040-5-X
- Jim Godbolt (1989), A History of Jazz in Britain, 1950 – 70. London: Quartet. ISBN 0-7043-2526-8
- Harry Gold (2000), Gold, Doubloons and Pieces of Eight London: Northway. ISBN 0-9537040-0-9
- Coleridge Goode and Roger Cotterrell (2002), Bass Lines: A Life in Jazz. London: Northway. ISBN 0-9537040-2-5
- Duncan Heining, (2012), Trad Dads, Dirty Boppers and Free Fusioneers: British Jazz, 1960-1975. London: Equinox Publishing. ISBN 978-18455340-5-9
- Duncan Heining (2023). And Did Those Feet: Six British Jazz Composers. Jazz in Britain. ISBN 978-1-9163206-6-6
- Richard Morton Jack (2024). Labyrinth: British Jazz on Record 1960-75, Lansdowne Books. ISBN 978-13999-7369-4
- Peter King (2011), Flying High: A Jazz Life and Beyond. London: Northway. ISBN 978-09550908-9-9
- George McKay (2005), Circular Breathing: The Cultural Politics of Jazz in Britain. Durham NC: Duke University Press. ISBN 0-8223-3573-5
- Catherine Parsonage (2005), The Evolution of Jazz in Britain, 1880 - 1935. Aldershot, Hampshire: Ashgate. ISBN 0-7546-5076-6
- Alan Robertson (2011), Joe Harriott: Fire in His Soul. 2nd edn. London: Northway. ISBN 978-0-9557888-5-7
- Ronnie Scott with Mike Hennessey (2013), Some of My Best Friends are Blues. 2nd edn. London: Northway. ISBN 978-09557888-8-8
- Simon Spillett,The Long Shadow of The Little Giant - The Life, Work and Legacy of Tubby Hayes. Equinox Publishing. ISBN 978-1781791738
- Jason Toynbee et al., eds. 2014. Black British Jazz: Routes, Ownership and Performance, Farnham: Ashgate. ISBN 9781472417565

== Jazz publications ==
Jazz publications in the UK have had a chequered history.

- Jazz Journal (known as Jazz Journal International, 1977–2009) was founded in 1947 and edited for many years by Sinclair Traill. It formerly tagged itself "the greatest jazz magazine in the world", but was thought to have ceased publication in January 2009. The holding company though absorbed Jazz Review around April 2009, and the magazine was revived at the end of that month, edited by Mark Gilbert.
- Jazz Monthly (1955–71), edited by Albert McCarthy, had a particularly high reputation during its run and numbered many of the leading British jazz critics of the time among its contributors.
- Jazz Review (1998–2009) was published by the music promoter Direct Music. A monthly, for most of its history, it was edited by Richard Cook, until his death in 2007. It was formally absorbed by Jazz Journal in April 2009.
- Jazz UK has for many years been the main periodical specialising in news and features about jazz in Britain. Its former editors are Jed Williams and John Fordham.
- Jazzwise is a monthly founded in 1997 that mainly covers modern and contemporary jazz.
- Melody Maker, founded as a jazz magazine, had a notable proselytiser for the music in Max Jones on its staff, but it had abandoned its coverage of jazz by the late 1970s.
- The Wire was founded in 1982 originally as a jazz magazine with contributions from Max Harrison and Richard Cook among others, but subsequently broadened its focus.

== Specialist publishers ==
- Jazz in Britain is a not-for profit record label and a book publishing company, founded in 2019. It publishes books on British jazz and British jazz musicians and releases albums of rare or lost recordings and out-of-print albums.
- Northway Books founded in 2000, is a British publishing company specialising mainly in books about the history of jazz in Britain.
- UK Jazz News (formerly London Jazz News) is a digital publication founded in 2009. It features live and album reviews, interviews, and news articles. The website is predominantly volunteer-driven and accompanied by a weekly newsletter.

== British jazz musicians ==
- For a list, see Category:British jazz musicians.

== British jazz record labels ==
- Babel Label
- Candid Records (UK)
- Dutton Vocalion
- Edition Records
- E.G. Records
- Esquire Records
- Hep Records
- Leo Records
- Ogun Records
- Spotlite Records
- Whirlwind Recordings

== See also ==
- Music of the United Kingdom

== Television documentary ==
- Jazz Brittania at BBC Four
- Celebration: Loose Tubes. Documentary. The 21-piece jazz orchestra its first national tour. The musicians are shown conducting a jazz workshop in Sheffield, as well as performing. Directed by Christopher Swann produced by Granada Television. Channel Four, January 1987.
- Sounds Different: Music Out of Time. Ian Carr & his band Nucleus are seen during a two-day workshop with young musicians. Participants include Guy Barker, Django Bates, and Chris White. BBC Two, 28 November 1980.
