= Alun Morgan =

British jazz critic and writer (1928–2018)

Alun Morgan (24 February 1928 in Pontypridd, Wales – 11 November 2018) was a British jazz critic and writer.

Morgan became interested in jazz as a teenager during World War II, and Charlie Parker became a significant influence on him in the late 1940s. Morgan began to write on jazz from the early 1950 for Melody Maker, Jazz Journal, Jazz Monthly and Gramophone, and for 20 years from 1969 a weekly jazz column in a local Kent newspaper. Over his writing career he completed liner notes for over 2,500 albums, initially for Vogue Records. From 1954 he contributed to music programmes for BBC Radio.

Morgan was the author of a book on modern jazz in England and the co-author of several books on jazz records. He lectured on jazz at the Guildhall School of Music and Drama and the Royal Academy of Music in London.

In addition, until 1991 he was a full-time architect. Shortly after retiring from his other occupation, Morgan emigrated to Australia.

== Works ==
- 1960: Jazz On Record: A Critical Guide, with Charles Fox, Peter Gammond and Alexis Korner, Grey Arrow/Hutchinson
- 1968: Jazz on record: a critical guide to the first 50 years, with Albert McCarthy, Paul Oliver and Max Harrison, London: Hanover Books; New York: Oak Publications
- 1975: Modern Jazz-The Essential Records, with Max Harrison, Ronald Atkins, Michael James and Jack Cooke, Aquarius Books
- 1977: Modern Jazz - A survey of developments since 1939, with Raymond Horricks, London, Gollancz, 1956; Westport, CT, Greenwood Publishing
- 1984: Count Basie, (Jazz Masters series), Spellmount Publishers
- 1998, 1995: The Gramophone Jazz Good CD Guide, with Keith Shadwick, Dave Gelly, Steve Voce and Brian Priestley, Gramophone Publications
