= Ward Pinkett =

American jazz trumpeter and scat vocalist

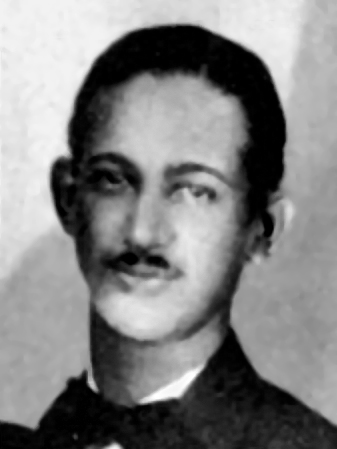
- Pinkett in 1933

Background information
- Birth name: William Ward Pinkett, Jr.
- Born: April 29, 1906; Newport News, Virginia, U.S.
- Died: March 15, 1937 (aged 30); New York City, New York, U.S.
- Genres: Jazz
- Occupation: Musician
- Instrument(s): Trumpet, vocals
- Years active: 1924–1935

William Ward Pinkett, Jr. (April 29, 1906 – March 15, 1937) was an American jazz trumpeter and scat vocalist during the Harlem Renaissance. A respected sideman recognized as a "hot" trumpet and with a versatile ear, he played and recorded with some of the greatest jazzmen of the era, including King Oliver, Jimmy Johnson, Chick Webb and Jelly Roll Morton. His career was cut short by alcoholism.

== Early life ==
Born into a musical family, Pinkett was the eldest of four children born to William Ward Pinckett and Mary Louise nee Carr of Newport News, Virginia. His father, a prosperous tailor and land owner, was an amateur cornet player who formed the Newport News Brass Band around 1900, playing for social clubs and funerals in the area. His mother played piano, often accompanying his father in the home, and his sister, Loretta Gillis (1913-1998), played saxophone in several local jazz bands.

Encouraged by his father, he started learning cornet at an early age and began playing trumpet at ten. He followed his father by enrolling in the Hampton University, where he played in the school band. There he met and received trumpet lessons from Harry R. Cooper, who was attending Hampton's architectural school. Before graduating, Pinkett was recruited by William A. Sykes, music director of the Haven Conservatory of Music of Meridian, Mississippi, to attend the private institute, along with several of his school friends, including trumpeter Harold F. Whittington, who also became a professional jazz musician.

Pinkett did not finish his studies at the academy. He joined Roy F. Johnson's Happy Pals, a well-known jazz orchestra from Richmond, Virginia. From there he went to the White Brothers Orchestra, a similar territory band from Washington, D.C., that played in the area bounded by Pittsburgh, New York, and its home base.

== Career ==
In January 1926, 19-year-old Pinkett joined Charlie Johnson's Original Paradise Band at Smalls Paradise in Harlem, Manhattan. In the summer of 1926 he switched to the 10-piece Willie Gant's Paradise Ramblers, who took over from Johnson as Smalls' house band from May 1926 to 1927. Jazz writer Albert McCarthy reported that Pinkett recorded three sides with Gant's band in the mid-1920s, based on an interview with Harry Cooper conducted by Charles Delaunay. Gant himself reported that he cut some sides during the period he led the Smalls Paradise band, but none of his recordings have been found. In July 1926 Pinkett recorded three songs with a band fronted by Tommy Morris, which are his earliest surviving recordings. Later that year he was with Billy Fowler's Society Orchestra and then James Hogan's band at the Joyland on 4th Ave. and 14th St.

In 1927 he joined banjoist Henri Saparo's Orchestra at the Bamboo Inn on Seventh Avenue and 139th Street. A fire closed the club down in June, and it reopened in the fall. Saparo continued as bandleader with Langston Curl on trumpet, but after Saparo left in early 1928 pianist Joe Steele took over the band and soon replaced Curl with Pinkett. Pinkett soon left and joined Bill Benford's band, which became the house band at the Rose Danceland on 125th street. Jelly Roll Morton came to New York in the spring of 1928 and caught Benford’s band playing at the Rose. Morton took over the band as the newest incarnation of his Red Hot Peppers. Pinkett became Morton's favorite trumpet player, recording with the band both as a member and after he left in late 1928 to play in Chick Webb's Harlem Stompers.

During his career, Pinkett also recorded with James P. Johnson, Bubber Miley, King Oliver, and Clarence Williams. Pinkett's last job was in 1935 performing at Adrian's Taproom in the basement of the Hotel President in Times Square with a group led by Albert Nicholas, along with Bernard Addison, Danny Barker and Joe Watts. Even though his alcoholism had progressed to the point that he was eventually fired for showing up drunk, in October of that year he cut six sides with the group, both as a vocalist and trumpeter, the last recordings he made. Pinkett was fired shortly afterward for showing up drunk.

== Personal life ==
On 16 August 1926, Pinkett took out a license in the city of New York to marry Pencie Bailey, a 15-year-old girl from his hometown of Newport News. On 27 November of that year, Bailey gave birth to a daughter, Doris Louise Pinkett, in Newport News, while living with her mother and siblings. By April 1930 Pinkett was living in New York on West 139th St. in Harlem with another wife, Ora Pinkett, a hostess/dancer at the Savoy Ballroom.

== Death ==
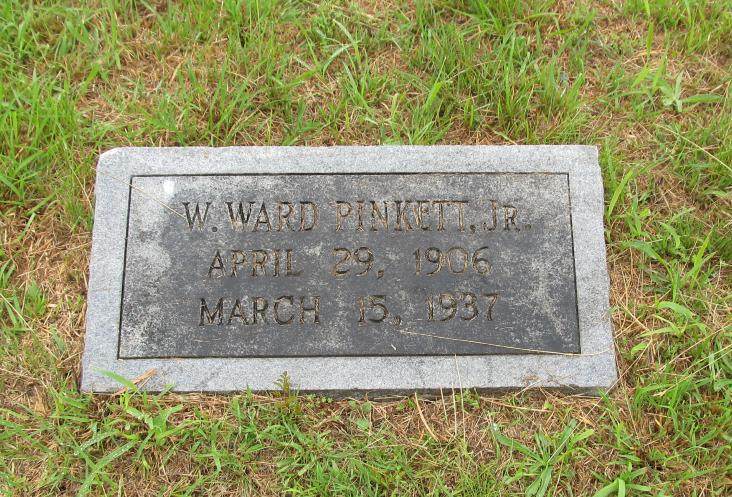

Pinkett was a heavy marijuana user and a chronic alcoholic, which made him unreliable as a band member. Little is known of his whereabouts after he left the Nicholas group. By 1937 he was living in a small, dingy room on the third floor above Reuben’s, a small after-hours bar owned by Reuben Harris on West 130th St. that was frequented by musicians. Danny Barker reported that Pinkett died an alcoholic death, continually drinking during his last days and not able to hold down food. He died there on the afternoon of 15 March 1937, at the age of 30, with lobar pneumonia given as the cause of death. His wife, Ora Pinkett, arranged for the body to be shipped to his family in Virginia, and he is buried in Pleasant Shade Cemetery in Hampton City, Virginia.

== Bibliography ==
- Barker, Danny (2016). Shipton, Alyn (ed.). A Life in Jazz. Louisiana Artists Biography Series. The Historic New Orleans Collection. ISBN 978-0-91-786071-3.
- Carr, Peter; Vollmer, Al; Wright, Laurie, eds. (April–May 1982). "Have Drum, Will Travel: An Interview with Tommy Benford, Part 1". Storyville (100): 124–9.
- Carr, Peter; Vollmer, Al; Wright, Laurie, eds. (February–March 1984). "Have Drum, Will Travel: An Interview with Tommy Benford, Part 2". Storyville (111): 105–7.
- Charters, Samuel B.; Kunstadt, Leonard (1984) [1962]. Jazz: A History of the New York Scene. Da Capo Press. ISBN 0-306-80225-2.
- Chilton, John (1985). Who's Who of Jazz: From Storyville to Swing Street. Da Capo Press. ISBN 0-306-76271-4.
- Hennessey, Thomas (1973). From Jazz to Swing: Black Jazz Musicians and Their Music, 1917-1935 (PhD). Northwestern University.
- Kragting, Ben Jr. (June 1990). "Harry R. Cooper (1903-1961): The shadow of a Forgotten Musician". Storyville (142): 124–36.
- Lipskin, Mike; Kunstadt, Len (October 1960). "This is William D. Gant". Record Research (30): 3–4, 16.
- McCarthy, Albert J. (June 1946a). "Collector's Notes". Jazz Forum. 1 (1): 25–6.
- McCarthy, Albert J. (September 1946b). "Ward Pinkett". Jazz Forum. 1 (2): 24–27.
- McCarthy, Albert J. (1983). Big Band Jazz. Exeter Books. ISBN 9780907408703.
- "Piano Recital Monday Missionary Church". Newport News Daily Press. 22 June 1924. p. 20.
- Spencer, Jim; Gillis, Loretta (28 February 1998). "A Lifetime of Music". Newport News Daily Press. pp. A1, A10.
- Williams, Eugene (November 1941). "A Note on Ward Pinkett". Jazz Information. 2 (16): 39, 90.
- Winfield, George; Carr, Peter (1978). You Don't Know Me, But ... Storyville Publications and Co. Ltd. OCLC 8603609.
