= Jazz Book Club =

British publishing project

The Jazz Book Club (JBC) was a publishing project of Sidgwick & Jackson, a London-based publisher. Herbert Jones, the editor, and a distinguished panel, selected the works. Sixty-six issues, and various extras were published from 1956 to 1967.

== Publications ==
Issue	Author	Title	Year	OCLC
1	Alan Lomax	Mister Jelly Roll	1956	
2	Wilder Hobson	American Jazz Music	1956	
3	Eddie Condon	We Called It Music: A Generation of Jazz	1956	
4	Humphrey Lyttelton	I Play as I Please	1956	
5	Dorothy Baker	Young Man with a Horn	1957	
6	Walter C. Allen, Brian Rust	King Joe Oliver	1957	
7	Louis Armstrong	Satchmo	1957	
8	Iain Lang	Jazz in Perspective	1957	
9	William Broonzy	Big Bill Blues	1957	
10	Sinclair Traill	Play that Music	1958	
11	Ethel Waters, Charles Samuels	His Eye is on the Sparrow	1958	
12	André Hodeir	Hommes et problèmes du jazz	1958	
13	Frederic Ramsey, Charles Edward Smith	Jazzmen	1958	
14	Raymond Horricks	Count Basie and his Orchestra	1958	
15	Sinclair Traill	Concerning Jazz	1959	
16	Milton Mezzrow, Bernard Wolfe	Really the blues	1959	
17	Winthrop Sargeant	Jazz, Hot and Hybrid	1959	
18	Hugues Panassié	Monsieur Jazz	1959	
19	David Boulton	Jazz in Britain	1959	
20	Peter Gammond (ed)	Duke Ellington: His Life and Music	1959	
21	Humphrey Lyttelton	Second Chorus	1960	
22	Charles Wareing, George Barlick	Bugles for Beiderbecke	1960	
23	Barry Ulanov	A Handbook of Jazz	1960	
24	Roland Gant	A World in a Jug	1960	
25	Rudi Blesh, Harriet Janis	They All Played Ragtime	1960	
26	Francis Newton	The Jazz Scene	1960	
27	Raymond Horricks	These Jazzmen of Our Time	1960	
28	William C. Handy	Father of the Blues	1961	
29	John Clellon Holmes	The Horn	1961	
30	Ralph Gleason	Jam Session: An Anthology of Jazz	1961	
31	Leonard Feather	The Book of Jazz: A Guide to the Entire Field	1961	
32	Rex Harris	Enjoying Jazz	1961	
33	Samuel Charters	The Country Blues	1961	
34	Whitney Balliett	The Sound of Surprise: 46 Pieces on Jazz	1961	
35	Martin Williams	The Art of Jazz: Essays on the Nature and Development of Jazz	1962	
36	Sidney Bechet	Treat it Gentle	1962	
37	Jay Smith, Lenn Guttridge	Jack Teagarden. The story of a jazz maverick	1962	
38	Stanley Dance	Jazz Era: The Forties	1962	221975291
39	Henry Pleasants	Death of a Music? The Decline of the European Tradition and the Rise of Jazz	1963	
40	Paul Oliver	Blues Fell This Morning	1963	
41	Burnett James	Essays on Jazz	1963	
42	Jay Allison Stuart	Call Him George	1963	
43	Dom Cerulli, Burt J. Korall, Nasatir Mort	The Jazz Word	1963	
44	Harry Otis Brunn	The Story of the Original Dixieland Jazz Band	1963	
45	Charles Delaunay	Django Reinhardt	1963	
46	John Alfred Williams	Night Song	1964	
47	Benny Green	The Reluctant Art: Five Studies in the Growth of Jazz	1964	
48	Sidney Finkelstein	Jazz: A People’s Music	1964	
49	Neil Leonard	Jazz and the White Americans; The Acceptance of a New Art Form	1964	
50	Herbert A. Simmons	Man Walking on Eggshells	1964	
51	Wingy Manone	Trumpet on the wing	1964	
52	Martin Williams	Jazz Panorama	1965	
53	Robert George Reisner	Bird. The Legend of Charlie Parker	1965	
54	André Hodeir	Toward Jazz	1965	
55	Joachim-Ernst Berendt	Das neue Jazzbuch	1965	
56	Whitney Balliett	Dinosaurs in the Morning: 41 Pieces on Jazz	1965	
57	Max Kaminsky	My Life in Jazz	1965	
58	Ralph de Toledano	Frontiers of Jazz	1966	
59	LeRoi Jones	Blues People: Negro Music in White America	1966	
60	Willie the Lion Smith	Music on my Mind	1966	
61	Studs Terkel	Giants of Jazz	1966	
62	Harold Courlander	Negro Folk Music USA	1966	
63	Hugues Panassié	The Real Jazz	1967	
64	Paul Oliver	Conversation with the Blues	1967	
65	Peter Clayton, Peter Gammond	14 Miles on a Clear Night	1967	
66	W.T. Ed. Kirkeby	The Story of Fats Waller	1967	

Extra volumes

Author	Title	Year	OCLC
Albert McCarthy, Nat Hentoff	Jazz		
Ken Williamson	This is Jazz		
Ross Russell	The Sound		
Peter Leslie	The Book of Bilk		
Sigmund Spaeth	A History of Popular Music in America		
Peter Gammond (ed)	The Decca Book of Jazz		
	Esquire’s World of Jazz		
Dennis Stock, Nat Hentoff	Jazz Street		
Gerald Lascelles, Sinclair Traill (ed)	Just Jazz vol IV		
Leonard Feather	The Encyclopedia of Jazz		
Billie Holiday	Lady Sings the Blues	1960	156745483
