= Ward Pinkett discography =

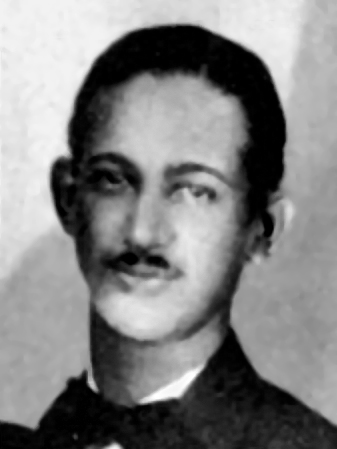
- Pinkett in 1933
- Singles: 36

William Ward Pinkett, Jr. (April 29, 1906—March 15, 1937) was an American jazz trumpeter and scat vocalist active during the Harlem Renaissance. A respected sideman recognized as a "hot" trumpet and with a versatile ear, he played and recorded with various bands in New York City. His career was cut short by alcoholism.

== Discography ==
All recordings took place in New York City. An asterisk (*) indicates vocal in addition to trumpet.

=== Original issues ===
The year and label information for the first vinyl release.

Year	Title(s)	Original Label	Credit
1926-7-13	"Jackass Blues"	Victor 20179-A	Thomas Morris and His Seven Hot Babies
1926-7-13	"Charleston Stampede"	Victor 20180-B	Thomas Morris and His Seven Hot Babies
1926-7-13	"Lazy Drag"	Victor 20483-A	Thomas Morris and His Seven Hot Babies
1928-6-11	"Georgia Swing"	Victor 38024	Jelly Roll Morton's Red Hot Peppers
1928-6-11	"Kansas City Stomps" / "Boogaboo"	Victor 38010	Jelly Roll Morton's Red Hot Peppers
1928-6-11	"Shoe Shiner's Drag"	Victor 21658-B	Jelly Roll Morton's Red Hot Peppers
1929-6-4	"Top and Bottom" / "Coalyard Shuffle"	Victor 38066	Joe Steele and His Orchestra
1929-6-14 / 1929-6-27	"Jungle Mama" / "Dog Bottom"*	Brunswick 4450	Jungle Band (Chick Webb's Harlem Stompers)
1930-3-5 / 1930-7-14	"Each Day" / "Strokin' Away" V2	Victor 23351	Jelly Roll Morton and His Red Hot Peppers
1930-3-19	"Harmony Blues" / "Little Lawrence"	Victor 38135	Jelly Roll Morton and His Red Hot Peppers
1930-3-20	"Fussy Mabel" / "Ponchatrain"	Victor 38125	Jelly Roll Morton and His Red Hot Peppers
1930-3-5 / 1930-10-9	"That'll Never Do" / "Fickle Fay Creep"	Victor 23019	Jelly Roll Morton and His Red Hot Peppers
1930-5-16	"I Lost My Gal From Memphis" / "Without You, Emaline"	Victor V-38138	Bubber Miley and His Mileage Makers
1930-6-2 / 1930-3-5	"Oil Well" / "If Someone Would Only Love Me"	Victor 23321	Jelly Roll Morton and His Red Hot Peppers
1930-7-14 / 1930-3-5	"Mushmouth Shuffle" / "I'm Looking For A Little Bluebird"	Victor 23004	Jelly Roll Morton and His Red Hot Peppers
1930-6-2	"Load of Coal"	Victor 23429-B	Jelly Roll Morton and His Red Hot Peppers
1930-6-2	"Primrose Stomp"	Victor 23424-A	Jelly Roll Morton and His Red Hot Peppers
1930-7-3	"Black Maria" / "Chinnin' and Chattin' With May"	Victor V-38146	Bubber Miley and His Mileage Makers
1930-7-14	"Low Gravy"	Victor 23334-B	Jelly Roll Morton and His Red Hot Peppers
1930-7-14	"Blue Blood Blues"	Victor 22681-B	Jelly Roll Morton and His Red Hot Peppers
1930-9-17	"Loving You The Way I Do" / "The Penalty of Love"	Victor 23010	Bubber Miley and His Mileage Makers
1930-10-9 / 1930-6-2	"Gambling Jack" / "Crazy Chords" V2	Victor 23307	Jelly Roll Morton and His Orchestra
1930-10-31	"Papa De-Da-Da"* / "Baby Won't You Please Come Home?"	Banner 32021	Clarence Williams and His Orchestra
1930-10-31 / 1930-11-24	"Hot Lovin'"* / "Shout Sister, Shout!"	Banner 32063	Clarence Williams and His Orchestra
1931-1-9	"Papa De Da Da" / "Stop Crying"*	Brunswick 6053	King Oliver and His Orchestra
1931-1-9	"Who's Blue"*	Brunswick 6046	The Savannah Syncopators (King Oliver and His Orchestra)
1931-2-19	"Shout Sister, Shout!"	Clarion 5381-C	Memphis Hot Shots (Clarence Williams and His Jazz Kings)
1931-2-19	"Papa De-Da-Da"* / "Baby Won't You Please Come Home?"	Columbia 14666-D	Clarence Williams and His Jazz Kings
1931-3-25	"Go Harlem" / "Just A Crazy Song (Hi-Hi-Hi)"*	Columbia 2448-D	Jimmy Johnson and His Orchestra
1931-3-25	"A Porter's Love Song (To A Chambermaid)"	Columbia 14668-D	Jimmy Johnson and His Orchestra
1931-4-15	"Loveless Love" / "One More Time"	Vocalion 1610	Chocolate Dandies (King Oliver and His Orchestra)
1931-4-15	"When I Take My Sugar To Tea"*	Vocalion 1617	Chocolate Dandies (King Oliver and His Orchestra)
1935-10-5	"Ev'rything Is Okey Dokey"*	Bluebird B-6144 A	The Little Ramblers
1935-10-5	"I'm On A See-Saw"* / "I'm Painting The Town Red"*	Bluebird B-6130	The Little Ramblers
1935-10-5	"Red Sails In The Sunset"* / "Tender Is The Night"*	Bluebird B-6131	The Little Ramblers
1935-10-5	"Tap Room Special" (Panama)	Bluebird B-5193 A	The Little Ramblers

=== Lost, unissued, or posthumous releases ===
Over the years alternate and unissued takes have been released in compilations of various bandleaders. In the table below, the first date indicates the recording date. The year of issue follows the label information for the first release.

Year	Title	Label and year of issue	Credit and additional notes
1926	"Static Strut"	Columbia?	Willie Gant and His Orchestra
1926	"Someday Sweetheart"	Columbia?	Willie Gant and His Orchestra
1926	"Paradise Stomp"	Columbia?	Willie Gant and His Orchestra
1928-6-11	"Honey Babe"	Victor unissued	Jelly Roll Morton's Red Hot Peppers
1928-6-11	"Sidewalk Blues"	Victor unissued	Jelly Roll Morton's Red Hot Peppers
1929-6-4	"Top and Bottom" (V2) / "Coalyard Shuffle" (V2)	Victor 741057 (LP), 1972	Joe Steele and His Orchestra
1930-3-5	"Each Day" V2	Gannet GE-5552 (LP), 1973	Jelly Roll Morton and His Red Hot Peppers
1930-6-2	"Oil Well" V2 / "Crazy Chords" V1 / "Primrose Stomp" V2	Bluebird 2361-2-RB (CD), 1990	Jelly Roll Morton and His Red Hot Peppers
1930-6-2	"Load of Coal" V2	Biltmore 1060, 1950?	Jelly Roll Morton and His Red Hot Peppers
1930-7-14	"Blue Blood Blues" V2	Bluebird 2361-2-RB (CD), 1990	Jelly Roll Morton and His Red Hot Peppers
1930-7-14 / 1930-3-5	"Strokin' Away" V1 / "Each Day" V2	Hot Jazz Club of America HC-33, 1949?	Jelly Roll Morton and His Red Hot Peppers
1930-7-14	"Low Gravy" V2	Victor unissued	Jelly Roll Morton and His Red Hot Peppers
1930-9-11	"Loving You The Way I Do" V2	Victor unissued	Bubber Miley and His Mileage Makers
1930-9-11	"The Penalty of Love" V2	Victor unissued	Bubber Miley and His Mileage Makers
1930-10-9	"Gambling Jack" V2	Bluebird 2361-2-RB (CD), 1990	Jelly Roll Morton and His Orchestra
1930-11-24	"Press The Button"	American Record Corporation unissued	Clarence Williams and His Orchestra
1930-11-24	"You're Bound To Look Like a Monkey When You get Old"	American Record Corporation unissued	Clarence Williams and His Orchestra
1931-2-19	"Rockin' Chair"	Columbia unissued	Clarence Williams and His Jazz Kings

== Sources ==
- McCarthy, Albert J. (June 1946a). "Collector's Notes". Jazz Forum. 1 (1): 25.
- McCarthy, Albert J. (September 1946b). "Ward Pinkett". Jazz Forum. 1 (2): 24–27.
- Rust, Brian (2002). Shaw, Malcolm (ed.). Jazz and Ragtime Records (1897–1942). Mainspring Press. ISBN 978-0-9671819-2-9.
- Yanow, Scott (2001). Class Jazz: The Musicians and Recordings that Shaped Jazz, 1895–1933). Backbeat Books. ISBN 978-0-87930-659-5.
