= Jazz at Ronnie Scott's =

Jazz at Ronnie Scott's was the house magazine of Ronnie Scott's Club in London's Soho, England. Available as a freesheet, it was published from 1979 to 2006 (159 issues) and was distributed throughout London to record shops and other locations.

Founded by Jim Godbolt, who was the magazine's only editor, the 24 page bi-monthly publication included a miscellany of articles, humorous writing, cartoons and photographs dealing with more general jazz issues and reminiscences in addition to publicising the Club's activities.

Its many contributors included: Alan Plater, Steve Race, Bruce Crowther, Wally Fawkes, Terry Brown, Campbell Burnap, Roy Davenport, Brian Davies, Derek Everett, Digby Fairweather, Barry Fox, Charles Fox, Michael Garrick, Mike Gavin, Wally Houser, Alun Morgan, Chris Parker, Jack Pennington, Alain Presencer, Ron Rubin, Jimmy Parsons, Tony Crombie, and Flash Winston.

In 2008 Hampstead Press published Ronnie Scott's Jazz Farrago, a lavishly produced compilation of best features from the magazine.
