= Space Walk =

Studio album by Don Rendell Quintet
- Released: 1972
- Recorded: December 1970
- Studios: Lansdowne Studios, Holland Park, London
- Genre: Jazz
- Length: 39.45
- Labels: Lansdowne Records / EMI Columbia Records; SCX 6491
- Producer: Denis Preston

Space Walk is an album by British jazz saxophonist Don Rendell, recorded in December 1970 and released on the EMI Columbia label in 1972 as part of their Lansdowne Series. This was Rendell's final recording under the Lansdowne banner before moving to Spotlite Records. Space Walk continued Rendell's exploration of modern modal jazz and displayed the enduring influence of John Coltrane on Rendell's composition and playing.

== Reception ==
Professional ratings
Review scores
| Source | Rating |
|---|---|
| AllAboutJazz | 3.5/5 stars |
| Jazzwise | 4/4 stars |
| Jazz Journal | 4.5/5 stars |

A contemporary review published in Crescendo International described Space Walk as "one of the most rewarding albums to come [their] way", praising the ensemble's incorporation of avant garde and free playing without ever sounding "self-indulgent". In a reissue review of Space Walk, AllAboutJazz scored the album 3 ½ stars, considering the album's music to be "vigorous and adventurous" but one that fell "outside the prevailing currents of jazz rock and free jazz". In a more sympathetic reappraisal of Space Walk as part of a 2021 reissue by Decca Records, Jazzwise noted that Rendell bravely deviated from the brass and saxophone orthodoxy of the time by using twin tenor saxophones in the frontline. The composition, "Euroaquillo", was also highlighted as best exemplifying Rendell's "affinity to post-hard-bop-into-middle-period-Coltrane". Jazzwise awarded the album 4 stars and the status of "Editor's choice".

== Track listing ==
All compositions by Don Rendell except where noted.

1. "On the Way" - 5:45
2. "Antibes" - 7:10
3. "Summer Song" - 6:18
4. "The Street Called Straight" - 5:27
5. "Euroaquilo" (Stan Robinson) - 7:16
6. "A Matter of Time" (Dave Quincy, Trevor Tomkins) - 5:29
7. "Space Walk" (Peter Shade) - 5:29

== Personnel ==
- Don Rendell – tenor saxophone, soprano saxophone, flute, alto flute
- Stan Robinson – tenor saxophone, clarinet, flute
- Peter Shade – vibraphone, flute
- Jack Thorncraft – bass, acoustic
- Trevor Tomkins – percussion
