= Storyville =

Historically, Storyville, New Orleans was the red light district of the city in Louisiana.

Storyville may also refer to:

== Companies ==
- Storyville Coffee

== Music ==
- Storyville Records, a Danish record label
- Storyville Records (George Wein's), a 1950s American jazz record label founded by George Wein
- Storyville (album), a 1991 Robbie Robertson album
- Storyville (magazine), British jazz magazine that ran from 1965 to 2003
- Storyville (band), an American blues-rock band

== Entertainment ==
- Storyville (nightclub), a nightclub in Boston, Massachusetts

== Movies and TV ==
- Storyville (film), a 1992 American film
- Storyville (TV series), a BBC documentary series
- Storyville Films, a U.S. film production company founded by Oren Jacoby
