= Jenny Collins =

British radio presenter (1942/1943 –2026)

- Born: Jennifer Collins; 1942 or 1943; Liverpool, England
- Died: c. 2 January 2026 (aged 83)
- Spouse: Steve Voce (died 2023)
- Presenting career
- Station: BBC Radio Merseyside
- Style: Radio presenter and journalist
- Country: United Kingdom

Jennifer Collins (1942 or 1943 – c. 2 January 2026) was a radio presenter, producer and reporter from Liverpool, England. She was best known for her work on BBC Radio Merseyside.

== Life and career ==
Collins was one of the founding members of BBC Radio Merseyside in 1967. The first programme kicked off with Vic Marmion reporting from the excavations for the Wallasey Tunnel and Keith Macklin who hosted from a party on board the Royal Daffodil, Collins took phone calls from the first ever listeners. Collins also started out as a reporter and presenter, hosting shows such as Junior Spin, later becoming a Senior Producer and Programme Controller for the station. Collins later produced shows such as Jazz Panorama and Write Now. Collins was married to former BBC Radio 2 and Jazz Journal columnist Steve Voce, he died in 2023.

Collins's death at the age of 83 was announced on 2 January 2026.
