= Brian Priestley =

English jazz writer, pianist, and arranger (born 1940)

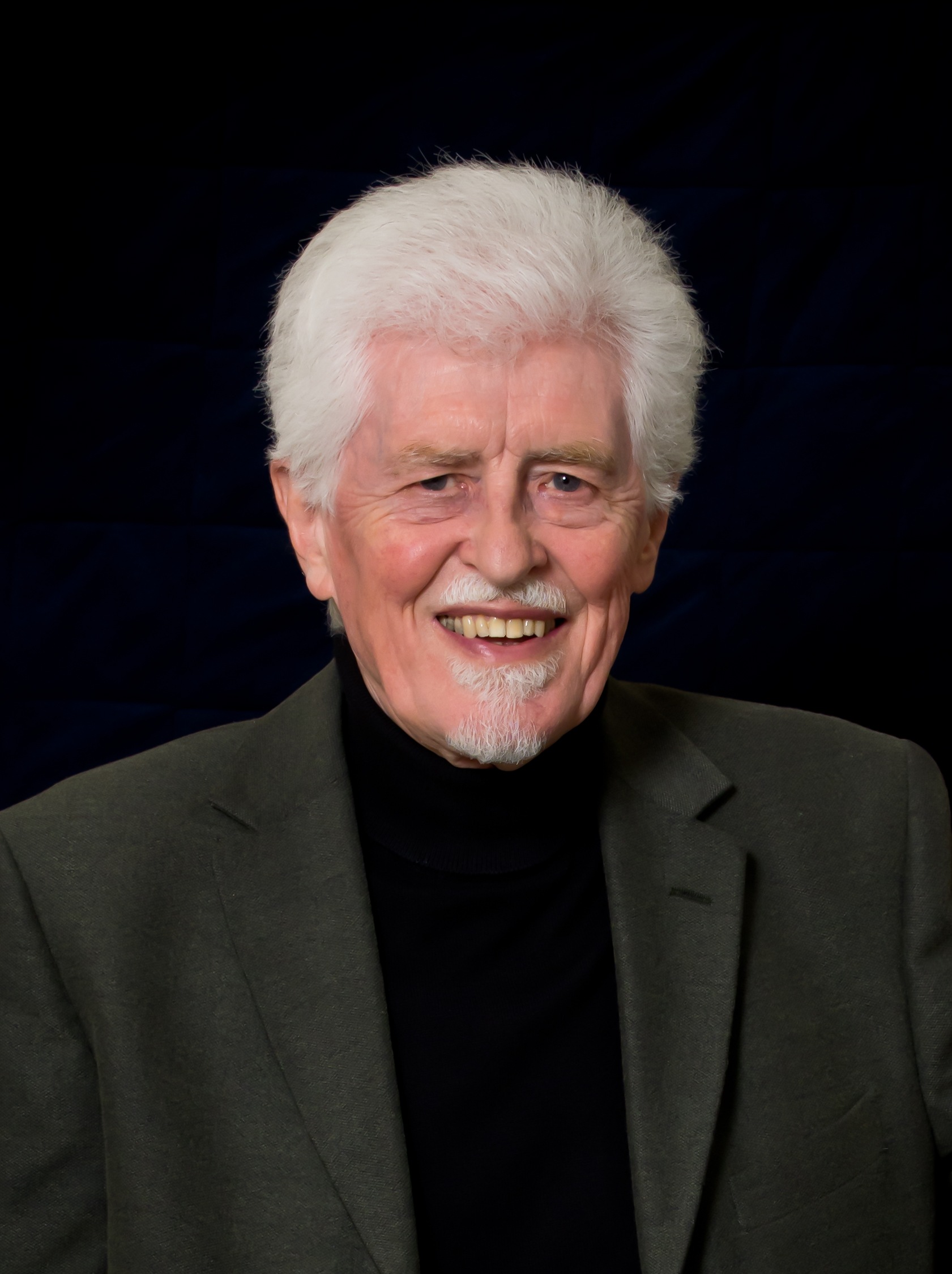
- Priestley in 2014

Background information
- Born: 10 July 1940 (age 85)
- Origin: Manchester, England
- Genres: Jazz
- Occupations: Musician; writer; arranger
- Instrument: Piano

Brian Priestley (born 10 July 1940) is an English jazz writer, pianist, and arranger.

== Biography ==
Priestley was born in Manchester, England. He began studying music at the age of eight. In the 1960s, he earned a degree in modern languages from Leeds University, meanwhile playing in student bands. In the mid-1960s, he began contributing to the jazz press and was responsible for entries in Jazz on Record: A Critical Guide to the First Fifty Years, 1917–67 (1968), edited by Albert McCarthy.

In 1969, Priestley moved to London and began playing piano with bands led by Tony Faulkner and Alan Cohen. He helped transcribe Duke Ellington's Black, Brown and Beige and Creole Rhapsody for Cohen and formed his own Special Septet featuring Digby Fairweather and Don Rendell. His compositions include "Blooz for Dook" (published in his 1986 book Jazz Piano 4), "The Whole Thing" (recorded by the National Youth Jazz Orchestra in 1997) and "Jamming with Jools" (a 1998 examination piece for the Associated Board of Royal Schools of Music, based on a live broadcast with Jools Holland).

He is also known for his broadcasting work on the BBC as well as London Jazz FM and his weekly series for BBC Radio London, which influenced a renewed interest in jazz in the 1980s. Priestley taught jazz piano at Goldsmiths College from 1977 to 1993 and has taught jazz history for various other universities and conservatoires over the years. He has also written biographies of Charles Mingus, John Coltrane, and Charlie Parker, as well as the book Jazz on Record: A History. He co-authored The Rough Guide to Jazz, as well as contributing to several other reference books, and has compiled and/or annotated more than a hundred reissue compilations.

Since 2006, Priestley has lived in Tralee, Ireland, where he continues playing the piano and presents a show on Radio Kerry.

== Discography ==
- Love You Gladly (Cadillac, 1988)
- You Taught My Heart to Sing (Spirit of Jazz, 1994) – with Don Rendell
- Love You Madly (33 Jazz, 1999) – with Louise Gibbs and Tony Coe
- Who Knows (33 Jazz, 2004)

== Literature ==
- Priestley. Charlie Parker, Hippocrene Books, Tunbridge Wells 1984, ISBN 0-946771-00-6
- Priestley. Chasin' the Bird – The Life and Legacy of Charlie Parker, Oxford University Press 2007, ISBN 0-19-532709-8
- Priestley. Jazz on Record: A History, Elm Tree Books, London 1988, ISBN 0-241-12440-9
- Priestley. Jazz Piano (Vols.) 1 - 6, (transcribed solos by 53 pianists), IMP, London 1983–1990
- Priestley. John Coltrane, Apollo Press, London 1986, ISBN 0-948820-02-0
- Priestley. Mingus. A Critical Biography, Da Capo Press, New York 1985, ISBN 0-306-80217-1
- Priestley, Digby Fairweather, Ian Carr. Jazz. The Rough Guide (The Essential Companion to Artists and Albums), 3rd edition, Rough Guides, 2004, ISBN 1-84353-256-5 (formerly as Jazz. The Essential Companion, Grafton Books 1988)
- Priestley. Digby Fairweather, Jazz: 100 Essential CDs. The Rough Guide, London 2001, ISBN 1-85828-732-4
- Priestley, Dave Gelly, Paul Trynka, Tony Bacon, The Sax and Brass Book – Saxophones, Trumpets and Trombones in Jazz, Rock and Pop, Balafon Books, London 1998, ISBN 1-871547-60-1
