= Geoffrey Smith (radio presenter) =

American-born British radio presenter (1943–2026)

- Born: 23 August 1943; Saginaw, Michigan, US
- Died: 2 April 2026 (aged 82)
- Occupations: Journalist, lecturer, jazz author, radio presenter
- Spouses: Lenore Katola (m. 1971); Janette Grant
- Website: BBC profile

Geoffrey John Smith (23 August 1943 – 2 April 2026) was an American-born British-based radio presenter, author and jazz percussionist. He was the regular presenter of BBC Radio 3's Jazz Record Requests for over 20 years and also presented other programmes on the network.

== Life and career ==
Geoffrey John Smith was born in Saginaw, Michigan on 23 August 1943. His father Earl Smith was a pianist, who also played banjo in his local dance-band in Detroit, and his mother Mariane (nee Eisele) a teacher. Smith's own active jazz career ended in 1969, discouraged by the rise of rock music. In 1973 he came to Britain to complete a PhD, where he began a new career as a freelance journalist and lecturer, contributing articles and reviews to Country Life, New Society and The Spectator among others. He remained a regular contributor to Country Life and The Economist, for whom he wrote on music and other cultural subjects.

His first book The Savoy Opera: A New Guide to Gilbert and Sullivan, published in 1983, was a survey of Savoy opera. His biography of Stéphane Grappelli followed in 1987. In 1988 he adapted the Grappelli book into a series for BBC Radio 3, the first of his many broadcasts for the network. In 1991, on the death of Peter Clayton, he became the regular presenter of BBC Radio 3's Jazz Record Requests, until 2012 when Alyn Shipton took over. A new series hosted by Smith, Geoffrey Smith's Jazz, began on 6 May 2012 and ran until 27 October 2019.

Smith married flautist Lenore Katola in 1971. The marriage was dissolved and his second wife was Janette Grant. He died on 2 April 2026, at the age of 82, and was survived by his wife and their son Daniel.

== Books ==
- The Savoy Operas: A New Guide to Gilbert and Sullivan, March 1985, Universe Pub, ISBN 0-87663-455-2
- Stéphane Grappelli: A Biography, 1987, Michael Joseph, ISBN 1-85145-012-2
