= Roger Cotterrell =

British legal scholar

Roger B. M. Cotterrell FBA FAcSS is the Anniversary Professor of Legal Theory at Queen Mary University of London and was made a fellow of the British Academy in 2005. Previously he was the Acting Head of the Department of Law (1989–90), Head of the Department of Law (1990-1), Professor of Legal Theory (1990–2005) and the Dean of the Faculty of Laws (1993-6) at Queen Mary and Westfield College, University of London.

== Background ==
Roger Cotterrell studied law at University College London as an undergraduate and postgraduate and began his teaching career at the University of Leicester as a lecturer in law in 1969. After returning to London in 1973, he studied sociology and politics at Birkbeck College (1975-8) while teaching law full-time at Queen Mary College, University of London. Thereafter he was one of the small group of law and sociology academics in Britain who first specialised in the new field of sociology of law from the 1970s. His leading book on the subject has been translated into several languages. From the late 1990s he developed a "law and community" approach to socio-legal theory, attempting to replace sociology of law's traditional "law and society" approach, and stressing links with comparative law and the study of law's embeddedness in culture. The approach has influenced research in such diverse fields as communal property rights, sentencing policy, and foreign investment law. His work on trusting relations in community has significantly influenced contemporary critical literature on the law of trusts.

He has also sought to redefine relations between jurisprudence and sociology, reformulating the idea of a sociological jurisprudence, and has argued that the role of jurists must be value-oriented rather than merely technical. His writings insist on clearly distinguishing jurisprudence (as the professional theoretical and practical knowledge of jurists) from the currently dominant forms of Anglophone legal philosophy.

In 2013 he was awarded the Socio-Legal Studies Association prize for "contributions to the socio-legal community" and in 2014 was made a fellow of the Academy of Social Sciences. In 2022 he was awarded the Dennis Leslie Mahoney Prize in Legal Theory.

He has also broadcast, published and given public talks on jazz. He wrote profiles of musicians and reviewed music for many magazines from the late 1960s until the 1990s, and has edited and contributed to books on jazz. From 1975 to 1992 he wrote regularly for the Warsaw-based magazine Jazz Forum, published internationally in English, German and Polish editions. His son is the artist David Cotterrell.

== Main publications ==
Books

- The Sociology of Law: An Introduction. London: Butterworths / Oxford University Press (2nd edn, 1992)
- Law, Democracy and Social Justice. (co-edited with Brian Bercusson) Oxford: Blackwell (1988)
- The Politics of Jurisprudence: A Critical Introduction to Legal Philosophy. Oxford: Oxford University Press (2nd edn, 2003)
- Law and Society. (edited) Abingdon: Routledge (1994)
- Law's Community: Legal Ideas in Sociological Perspective. Oxford: Clarendon Press (1995)
- Emile Durkheim: Law in a Moral Domain. Stanford: Stanford University Press / Edinburgh: Edinburgh University Press (1999)
- Sociological Perspectives on Law. (edited) Abingdon: Routledge, 2 vols (2001)
- Bass Lines - A Life in Jazz. (with Coleridge Goode) London: Northway (2002)
- Law in Social Theory. (edited) Abingdon: Routledge (2006)
- Law, Culture and Society: Legal Ideas in the Mirror of Social Theory. Abingdon: Routledge (2006)
- Living Law: Studies in Legal and Social Theory. Abingdon: Routledge (2008)
- Emile Durkheim: Justice, Morality and Politics. (edited) Abingdon: Routledge (2010)
- Authority in Transnational Legal Theory. (co-edited with Maksymilian Del Mar) Cheltenham: Edward Elgar (2016)
- Sociological Jurisprudence: Juristic Thought and Social Inquiry. New York / London: Routledge (2018)
- Jurisprudence and Socio-Legal Studies: Intersecting Fields. New York / London: Routledge (2024)

== Other sources ==
- Richard Nobles and David Schiff (eds), Law, Society and Community: Socio-Legal Essays in Honour of Roger Cotterrell. Abingdon: Routledge (2014)
- Nick Piska and Hayley Gibson (eds), Critical Trusts Law: Reading Roger Cotterrell. Coventry: Counterpress (2024)
- Eric Loefflad and Raul Madden (eds), Special issue: International Journal of Law in Context Vol 22, no 3 (September 2026) 'The Law and Politics of Trusting: Revisiting Roger Cotterrell Amid Contemporary Global Realities'.
- Javier Ignacio Valdes Torres, Interview with Roger Cotterrell (2026) https://qmro.qmul.ac.uk/server/api/core/bitstreams/af9d072d-0e94-410b-bd64-505cac58a187/content
