= The Escorts (British band) =

English Merseybeat band (1962–1966)

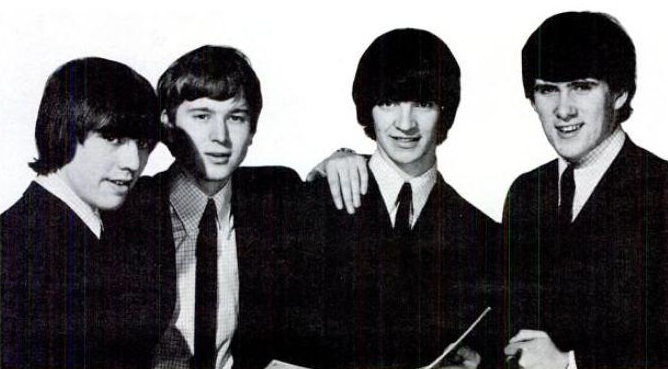
- The Escorts in 1965

Background information
- Origin: Liverpool, England
- Genre: Merseybeat
- Years active: 1962–1966
- Labels: Fontana, Columbia
- Past members: Terry Sylvester; John Kinrade; Mike Gregory; Pete Clarke

The Escorts were a Merseybeat band formed in October 1962 in Liverpool, England, by three classmates who had just left the Morrison School for Boys in Rose Lane, Allerton — Mike Gregory, Terry Sylvester and John Kinrade. In 1963, they were voted the ninth most popular group in Liverpool by readers of Mersey Beat magazine from a competitive field of several dozen popular Liverpool bands of the time.

== Career ==
They originally consisted of:

- Terry Sylvester — guitar/lead vocals (born Terence James Silvester, 8 January 1947, Allerton, Liverpool)
- John Kinrade — lead guitar/vocals (born John Knowles, 25 June 1946, Southport, Lancashire)
- Mike Gregory — bass guitar/vocals (born Michael Gregory, 7 November 1946, Liverpool Maternity Hospital, Kensington, Liverpool)
- Ray Walker — lead vocals
- Johnny Foster — drums; replaced by Pete Clarke (born Peter Gordon Gaskell, 26 May 1946, Liverpool); replaced by Kenny Goodlass from The Kirkbys; replaced by Pete Clarke; replaced by Tommy Kelly of Earl Preston's Realms; replaced by Paul Comerford of The Cryin' Shames.

Terry Sylvester was replaced by Frank Townsend from The Easybeats (1961–66) and the Beachwoodsand A Taste of Honey who was later to become a member of Tony Rivers and the Castaways. Paddy Chambers (ex-Faron's Flamingos and The Big Three) subsequently replaced Townsend. Sylvester left to join The Swinging Blue Jeans in 1966, before replacing Graham Nash in The Hollies. He now lives in Toronto and travels all over the United States and Canada playing concerts with artists such as Billy J. Kramer, Peter Noone, Joey Molland and other British Invasion acts. Sylvester also does a one-man show.

Paul McCartney played tambourine on their last record, "From Head to Toe" in 1966.

John Kinrade stopped playing after The Escorts split up in 1967, sold his Gretsch guitar and became a hairdresser with two salons.

Mike Gregory would also leave The Escorts in 1967 to join The Swinging Blue Jeans, and stayed until 1973, whereupon after leaving and doing sessions for a couple of years, he formed a group with Johnny Goodison of the original Brotherhood of Man called Big John's Rock and Roll Circus in 1975. Gregory stayed in 'The Circus' until its demise in 2005, and became a solo artist.

Drummer Pete Clarke recorded an instrumental solo single in 1968. For a while that same year he became the in-house session drummer for Apple Music and is notable on a couple of songs on Jackie Lomax's album, Is This What You Want?. Still wanting to be in a group, in 1969 he joined the strange poetry band, The Liverpool Scene, and still working for Apple he did sessions for Kiki Dee and Billy Preston, and then did a brief stint in Badfinger. He is now living in the US.

Although they never released a full album during their short time together, much later (1983) at the instigation of Elvis Costello, Edsel Records released an LP containing all twelve songs from the six singles. It was released on CD in 1995 as EDCD 422 and entitled From the Blue Angel, as a reference to the club (owned by Allan Williams, The Beatles' first manager) where The Escorts began performing in 1962. Costello also released a single which was a copy of The Escorts last recording, "From Head to Toe" / "Night Time".

== Discography ==
=== Compilation ===
- From the Blue Angel - Edsel Records, 1982

=== Singles ===
- "Dizzy, Miss Lizzy" (Larry Williams) / "All I Want Is You" (Ireland/Chilton) (April 1964), Fontana TF 453
- "The One to Cry" (Weiss/Schlaks) / "Tell Me Baby" (Ireland/Chilton) (June 1964), Fontana TF 474 - UK No. 49
- "I Don't Want to Go On Without You" (Burns/Wexler) / "Don't Forget to Write" (Ireland/Chilton) (1965), Fontana TF 516
- "C'mon Home Baby" (Addrisi) / "You'll Get No Lovin' That Way" (Jimmy Campbell/ Escorts) (1965), Fontana TF 570
- "Let It Be Me" (Gilbert Bécaud/Mann Curtis/Pierre Delanoë) / "Mad Mad World" (Osborne/Burnette) (January 1966), Fontana TF 651
- "From Head to Toe" (Smokey Robinson) / "Night Time" (Chambers) (December 1966), Columbia DB 8061
