= Alyn Shipton =

Writer, broadcaster and critic (born 1953)

- Born: 24 November 1953 (age 72)
- Education: St Edmund Hall, Oxford; Oxford Brookes University
- Occupations: Jazz author, presenter, critic and bassist
- Employer(s): Equinox Publishing; Royal Academy of Music
- Website: alynshipton.co.uk

Alyn Shipton (born 24 November 1953) is an English jazz author, presenter, critic, and jazz bassist.

== Early life ==
Shipton became interested in jazz in his youth and formally studied cello, but also played double bass in a school jazz band. He played both cello and bass in the West Surrey Youth Orchestra, and played in the first performance of John Dankworth's "Tom Sawyer's Saturday", commissioned for the Farnham Festival.

After winning an open scholarship to read English at St Edmund Hall, Oxford, Shipton ran the university jazz club. During that time he played with many guests who appeared there, including George Melly. The trumpeter with Melly, John Chilton, dates Melly's decision to go on the road with the Feetwarmers to their appearance with Shipton in Oxford in 1973. At Oxford, Shipton also wrote for the student magazine Isis and directed plays, including Ben Jonson's The Alchemist. Shipton had a keen interest in visual arts and was one of the authors of the catalogue of paintings in the collection of St Edmund Hall. He subsequently studied for his PhD (2004) in music at Oxford Brookes University.

== Later life and career ==
On leaving university, Shipton became an editor at Macmillan Publishers, working on primary school books and teenage fiction. His first book-length publication was an anthology of short stories on the theme of fantasy for John Murray (1982). For Macmillan, he produced editions of secondary-school English texts. During this time he played bass in the New Iberia Stompers, subsequently joining Sammy Rimington's band and the group led by jazz traditionalist Ken Colyer. In the 1980s, he became the publisher of Grove's Dictionaries of Music. As Music Publisher at Macmillan, he established a series of oral histories of jazz musicians, including lives of Barney Bigard, Buck Clayton, Art Rollini and Bill Coleman. Shipton's own first book, a biography of Fats Waller was published in 1988.

In 1987, Shipton moved to Oxford to manage the reference publishing at Blackwell Publishers, also establishing the NCC Blackwell computer publishing imprint with the National Computing Centre in Manchester. He began broadcasting on the Oxford local radio station Fox FM in 1989, going on to join BBC Radio 3 the same year with a series based on his Waller biography. For six years, Shipton was a presenter on the BBC World Service's Jazzmatazz, and was a regular contributor to (and then co-presenter of) the BBC Radio 3 series Impressions, which was mainly hosted by Brian Morton during its run from 1992 to 1998. From 1998 to 2001, Shipton presented the late-night programme Jazz Notes for Radio 3, going on to introduce many editions of the documentary strand Jazz File.

In 2001, he was named "Jazz Writer of the Year" at the British Jazz Awards. In 2003, he won the Willis Conover/Marian McPartland Lifetime Achievement in Jazz Broadcasting award from the Jazz Journalists' Association. In 2010, Shipton was Jazz Broadcaster of the Year in the UK Parliamentary Jazz Awards. From 2007 until 2012 he presented Jazz Library on BBC Radio 3, before taking over the long-running programme Jazz Record Requests in May from Geoffrey Smith. From 2016 to 2019, Shipton was executive producer of BBC Radio 3's new series Jazz Now. He also served as executive producer for Radio 3's Sunday Morning classical show from 2012 to 2019.

Shipton is the author of biographies (in addition to Waller) of Bud Powell (co-author), Dizzy Gillespie (winner of the 2001 ARSC Award for Jazz Research), and Ian Carr, and his New History of Jazz first appeared in 2001, with a revised edition being published in 2007. Shipton was critical of Ken Burns' 2000 Jazz documentary. Shipton has also published biographies of Jimmy McHugh (2009), Cab Calloway (2010) and Harry Nilsson (2013). The Nilsson biography won an ASCAP Deems Taylor Award for pop biography and an ARSC Award for research in Pop Music. His subsequent book was a collaboration with the jazz musician Chris Barber on Barber's autobiography. Shipton has also published the memoirs of 1960s pop star Billy J. Kramer, Do You Want To Know a Secret (2016).

Shipton wrote on jazz for The Times from 1992 to 2012, and still occasionally contributes to the paper; he has also written on jazz for The Guardian, The Daily Telegraph, Gramophone, and Jazzwise, for which he writes a monthly review of reissues. He is series editor for the Popular Music History book programme at Equinox Publishing, among the more recent additions to which is The History of European Jazz (ed. Francesco Martinelli, 2018).

Shipton has been an active musician throughout his career, working with the London Ragtime Orchestra (with whom he recorded two LPs), the big band Vile Bodies, Bill Greenow's bands Chansons and Rue Bechet, and he currently co-leads the Buck Clayton Legacy Band. The band's CD Claytonia recorded in concert at Sage, Gateshead, by BBC Radio 3 was released in 2013. Shipton appears on records with Ken Colyer (also on DVD), Herb Hall, Pat Halcox, Bill Greenow, Sammy Rimington, Bob Wilber, and Butch Thompson's King Oliver Centennial Band. Shipton has taught jazz history at several universities, including Oxford Brookes University and City University, London. He is at present a lecturer in jazz history and a research fellow at the Royal Academy of Music, London.

== Publications ==
As author

- Fats Waller His Life and Times (Universe, 1988)
- The Glass Enclosure – The Life of Bud Powell (with Alan Groves) (Bayou Press, 1993)
- Groovin' High: The Life of Dizzy Gillespie (Oxford, 1999)
- The Jazz Makers: Vanguards of Sound (Oxford, 2002)
- A New History of Jazz (Continuum, 20010. Revised edition, Bloomsbury, 2007)
- Handful Of Keys – Conversations with Thirty Jazz Pianists (Equinox, 2004)
- Out of the Long Dark – The Life of Ian Carr (Equinox, 2006)
- I Feel A Song Coming On – The Life of Jimmy McHugh (Illinois University Press, 2009)
- Hi De Ho – The Life of Cab Calloway (Oxford, 2010)
- Nilsson – The Life of a Singer-Songwriter (Oxford, 2013)
- The Art Of Jazz (Imagine, 2020)
- On Jazz – A Personal Journey (Cambridge, 2022)
- The Gerry Mulligan 1950s Quartets (Oxford, 2023)

As editor

- Danny Barker: A Life In Jazz (Macmillan, 1986. Revised edition, New Orleans Historic Collection, 2017)
- Doc Cheatham: I Guess I'll Get The Papers and Go Home (Cassell, 1996)
- Danny Barker: Buddy Bolden and the Last Days of Storyville (Continuum, 1998)
- George Shearing: Lullaby of Birdland (Continuum, 2004)
- Chris Barber: Jazz Me Blues (Equinox, 2014)
- Billy J Kramer: Do You Want To Know a Secret (Equinox, 2016)
