= Don Rendell =

English jazz musician and arranger (1926–2015)

- Born: Donald Percy Rendell; 4 March 1926; Plymouth, England
- Died: 20 October 2015 (aged 89) London, England
- Genres: Jazz
- Occupation: Musician
- Instruments: Tenor saxophone Soprano saxophone Flute; Clarinet
- Years active: 1943–2015

Donald Percy Rendell (4 March 1926 – 20 October 2015) was an English jazz musician and arranger. Mainly active as a tenor saxophonist, he also played soprano saxophone, flute, and clarinet.

== Career ==
Rendell was born in Plymouth, England, and raised in London where he attended the City of London School, to which he gained a choral half-scholarship. The school was evacuated during the Second World War to Marlborough College, where Rendell heard Jazz for the first time. His father, Percy, was the musical director of the D'Oyly Carte Opera Company; his mother Vera (née Trewin) was also a musician. His father died when Rendell was 16.

Rendell had begun to play the piano aged five, but switched to saxophone in his teens. While he began his working life in the Southgate branch of Barclay's Bank, he soon left to become a professional musician. He began his career on alto saxophone but changed to tenor saxophone in 1943. During the rest of the 1940s, he was in the bands of George Evans and Oscar Rabin. Beginning in 1950, he spent three years in a septet led by Johnny Dankworth. He performed with Billie Holiday in Manchester, England, before playing in the bands of Tony Crombie and Ted Heath. After touring in Europe with Stan Kenton, he played in Cyprus with Tony Kinsey. He was a member of Woody Herman's Anglo American Herd in 1959. During the late 1950s and early 1960s he led bands, including one with Ian Carr that lasted until 1969, one with Barbara Thompson in the 1970s, and as the sole leader in the 1980s and 1990s. In particular, the Rendell-Carr Quintet gained an international reputation. It performed at the Antibes Festival, France and was the Band of the Year for three years in succession in the Melody Maker poll. He performed in festivals in England and France and worked with Johnny Dankworth, Michael Garrick, and Brian Priestley.

Rendell taught at the Royal Academy of Music for three years in the early 1970s. The 1972 the Don Rendell Quintet LP Space Walk was his last to be produced by Denis Preston, and his last as a leader on a major label (EMI Columbia). It included four original compositions from Rendell. In 1976, his group called the Don Rendell Five, which featured saxophonist Barbara Thompson, issued Just Music on the small Spotlite label, showcasing Thompson. The group began touring and playing festivals while winning acclaim at home for their style of post-bop music. Rendell kept his session work up, appearing on the 1976 album A Lover and His Lass by Cleo Laine & the Johnny Dankworth Seven. Two years later, in 1978, he issued a double-A-side 12" single with the Don Rendell Five which again included Barbara Thompson as a member of "Roundabouts and Swings" b/w "Blues for Adolphe Sax." In 1979 the saxist issued his Ambitious live nonet project, Earth Music, performed at that year's Greenwich Festival. While it resonated with older fans, it became lost with the British music press's attention to the punk and post-punk music of this period.

In 1984 he began tuition at the Guildhall School of Music and Drama. He also wrote instruction books on flute and saxophone. His private pupils included the actor Warren Mitchell, an amateur saxophonist.

== Personal life and death ==
A Jehovah's Witness convert in 1956, Rendell said his new outlook meant he felt like an ordinary person for the first time in many years.

Rendell died at the age of 89 on 20 October 2015 in London, after a short illness. He was survived by his wife, Joan (née Yoxall), whom he married in 1948, his daughter, Sally, his sister, Doris, and three grandchildren.

== Discography ==
=== As leader/co-leader ===
- Meet Don Rendell (Tempo, 1955)[10"]
- Playtime (Decca, 1958)
- Roarin' (Jazzland, 1961)
- Shades of Blue with Ian Carr (Columbia, 1965) – rec. 1964
- Dusk Fire with Ian Carr (Columbia, 1966)
- Phase III with Ian Carr (Columbia, 1968)
- Change Is with Ian Carr (Columbia, 1969)
- Live with Ian Carr (Columbia, 1969)
- Greek Variations & Other Aegean Exercises with Ian Carr, Neil Ardley (Columbia, 1970)
- Space Walk (Columbia, 1972)
- Live at the Avgarde Gallery Manchester with Joe Palin (Spotlite, 1975) – live rec. 1972
- Just Music with Barbara Thompson (Spotlite, 1976)
- Earth Music (Spotlite, 1979)
- Time Presence (DR, 1988)
- If I Should Lose You (Spotlite, 1992)
- What Am I Here For? (Spotlite, 1996)
- Reunion (Spotlite, 2002)
- Live in London with Ian Carr (Harkit, 2003) – live rec. 1965
- Phase III / Live with Ian Carr (BGO, 2004) – rec. 1967–68
- Touch Links of Gold & A Portuguese Portrait (Spotlite, 2004)
- Original 1964-68 Recordings/Live from the Antibes Jazz Festival with Ian Carr (Spotlite, 2007)
- Live at the Union 1966 with Ian Carr (Reel Recordings, 2010) – live rec. 1966
- Live at Klooks Kleek (Record Collector Magazine, 2017)[2LP]

=== As sideman ===
With Neil Ardley

- A Symphony of Amaranths (Regal Zonophone, 1972)
- On the Radio: BBC Sessions 1971 (Dusk Fire, 2017)

With Johnny Dankworth

- Lifeline (Philips, 1973)
- Movies 'n' Me (RCA, 1974)
- A Lover and His Lass with Cleo Laine (Esquire, 1976)

With Amancio D'Silva

- Integration (Columbia, 1969)
- Konkan Dance (Vocalion, 2006)

With Michael Garrick

- Black Marigolds (Argo, 1966)
- A Jazz Cantata (Erase, 1969)
- The Heart Is a Lotus (Argo, 1970)
- Mr. Smith's Apocalypse (Argo, 1971)
- Home Stretch Blues (Argo, 1972)
- Troppo (Argo, 1974)
- Parting Is Such (Jazz Academy, 1995)
- Prelude to Heart Is a Lotus (Gearbox, 2013)
- A New Serious Music (Rhythm & Blues, 2021)

With Stan Tracey

- The Latin-American Caper (Columbia, 1969)
- We Love You Madly (Columbia, 1969)

With others

- Kenny Graham, Presenting Kenny Graham (Vocalion, 2008)
- John C. Williams, Tenorama (Spotlite, 2003)
- Joe Harriott, Genius (Jazz Academy, 2000)
- Ted Heath, Our Kind of Jazz (Decca, 1959)
- Richard Hewson, Love Is... (Splash, 1978)
- Mike Nevard's British Jazzmen, Leonard Feather Presents Cool Europe (Verve, 1994) – Split album with Jutta Hipp
- Brian Priestley, Love You Gladly (Cadillac, 1988)
- Cyril Stapleton, All Time Big Band Hits (Richmond, 1959)
- Guy Warren, Afro-Jazz (Columbia, 1969)
