= Joe Steele (musician) =

American jazz musician

Joseph Alexander Ellis Steele (December 17, 1899, Savannah, Georgia - February 5, 1964, New York City) was an American jazz pianist and bandleader.

Joseph Alexander Ellis Steele was born on December 17, 1899, in Savannah, Georgia, home to his father's family for several generations. His father, Alexander McPherson Steele, was a postal worker. As a teenager, Steele moved with his family to Boston, Massachusetts, his mother's hometown. Steele’s mother, Minnie Sarah Ellis Steele, was the daughter of a Jamaican minister, Rev. Alexander Ellis, who served as a pastor in Boston. Steele’s brother, Julian Steele, was a prominent African-American social worker, civil rights and affordable housing advocate, and office holder in Massachusetts.

Steele graduated from the New England Conservatory of Music with a diploma as a teacher and then played with the Savoy Bearcats on their recordings for Victor Records. He played the Bamboo Inn in Harlem with Henri Saparo and then put together his own band to play at the same venue. Members of his band included Ward Pinkett, Langston Curl, Bubber Miley, Harry Carney, Wendell Culley, Johnny Hodges, Joe Garland, Jimmy Archey, Charlie Holmes, and Manzie Johnson. He recorded for Victor as a leader in 1929. When George Gershwin sought a black pianist to play Rhapsody in Blue for a show in 1931, he selected Steele, who at that time was studying for a doctoral degree in music. In 1931-1932 he played in Pike Davis's ensemble accompanying the vaudeville show Rhapsody in Black, and worked with Chick Webb from 1932 to 1936. He also worked as an arranger, for Duke Ellington, Fletcher Henderson, Paul Whiteman, and Cab Calloway among others.
