= Jim Godbolt =

Jim Godbolt (5 October 1922 – 9 January 2013) was a British jazz writer and historian.

He was born in Sidcup, Kent. During a varied career in the music business, Godbolt worked as concert-promoter, manager to British jazz musicians, film consultant, broadcaster and compiler of album liner notes. He edited several jazz publications, including Jazz Illustrated, from 1950–51, 100 Club News, from 1979–84 and from 1980-2006 he was founding editor of Jazz at Ronnie Scott's, the house magazine of the jazz club in London.

Jim Godbolt also wrote for newspapers and periodicals, including Harpers & Queen and Melody Maker. He also headed the Jim Godbolt Entertainment Agency with Don Kingswell and looked after several groups including Swinging Blue Jeans.

== Selected bibliography ==
- Ronnie Scott's Jazz Farrago (2008), Foreword by George Melly, Hampstead Press, ISBN 978-0-95-576280-2
- A History of Jazz in Britain 1919-1950, (2010) (4th edn.), London: Northway Publications ISBN 978-0-95-578881-9
- A History of Jazz in Britain 1950-1970 (1989), Quartet Books, ISBN 978-0-70-432526-5
- All This and Many a Dog: Memoirs of a Loser/Pessimist (1986), Quartet Books, ISBN 978-0-70-432567-8
- The World of Jazz in Printed Ephemera and Collectibles (1991), Wellfleet, ISBN 978-1-55-521623-8
