= Storyville (magazine) =

British jazz magazine, 1965–2003

- Cover of December 1969 issue
- Editor: Laurie Wright (1929–2010)
- Categories: Music magazine
- Frequency: Semimonthly 1965–1986; Monthly 1987–1995; Biennially 1997–2003
- Format: Print
- Publisher: Laurie Wright
- Founder: Laurie Wright
- First issue: October 1, 1965
- Final issue Number: June 1, 1995 (29 years, 8 months) — 162 issues
- Company: Storyville Publications and Co. Ltd.
- Country: UK
- Based in: 1965–1973: Walthamstow, London; 1973–1995: Chigwell
- Language: English
- Website: National Jazz Archives
- ISSN: 0039-2030
- OCLC: 3335747

Storyville was a British jazz magazine that ran from 1965 to 2003 featuring jazz history, discography, and record trading. It was published six times a year from October 1965 to December 1986 (issues 1 to 128), then quarterly from March 1987 to June 1995 (issues 129 to 162), then four biennial volumes were published until 2003.

== History ==
Storyville was founded by Laurie Wright (né Lawrence D. Wright; 1929–2010). The publication has been acclaimed for containing a wealth of early historical material on jazz. And although Storyville was not officially a peer-reviewed journal — in part because, other than music librarians, few jazz scholars existed in academic research in 1965 — it was, nonetheless, peer-reviewed in reality by well-informed jazz enthusiasts, discographers, musicologists, and the like.

Separately from the magazine, Storyville Publications published books about jazz, notably discographies. Included were Wright's own works, the standard discographies, two volumes of Eric Townley's Tell Your Story; A Dictionary of Jazz and Blues Recordings 1917–1950, Tom Lord's bio-discography, Clarence Williams (1976), and several biographical and autobiographical memoirs of historic musicians. The last of these, published under Wright's name, was an autobiography, Trombone Man: Preston Jackson's Story (2005), after which ill-health forced Wright's retirement.

== Archival access ==
Digital

All issues are digitally reproduced and available on the website of the National Jazz Archive, a charitable organization based in Loughton, England, by permission of Lauri Wright's Estate.

- Storyville at the National Jazz Archives

Library codes

- ISSN 0039-2030
- OCLC 39287240
- OCLC 473364286
- OCLC 473169939
- OCLC 3335747
- OCLC 755453281

== Covers ==
- Covers

== See also ==
- Storyville Index: No. 1 to No. 162 (October 1965 through June 1995), compiled by Howard Rye (né Howard Willett Rye; born 1947) and P. J. S. Mitchell, revised and enlarged by Bernhard H. Behncke with additional references to artists, instruments, and locations, Hamburg, Germany (Summer 2002); OCLC 896680450
