= Ronnie Scott's Jazz Farrago =

UK book published by Ronnie Scott's Jazz Club

Ronnie Scott's Jazz Farrago is a book of articles collected from Jazz at Ronnie Scott's, the house magazine of Ronnie Scott's jazz club in London, England.

The magazine was published for over twenty-five years from 1979–2006, producing 159 issues under editorship of its founder, Jim Godbolt. Godbolt's other books include two volumes of History of Jazz in Britain, 1919–1950 and 1950–1970, The World of Jazz and the autobiography All This and Many a Dog.

Ronnie Scott's Jazz Farrago draws from those issues to describe an assortment of characters associated with Ronnie Scott's, including interviews with John Dankworth, Kenneth Clarke, Spike Milligan, Charlie Watts, Barbara Windsor, Michael Parkinson, and Ronnie Scott himself; poems by Ron Rubin, and drawings by Wally Fawkes (Trog), Nemethy, Picton, Pennington and Monty Sunshine; and photographs by David Redfern and David Sinclair. George Melly wrote the foreword.
