= Peter Clayton =

English jazz presenter, jazz critic and author

- Born: Peter James Clayton; 25 June 1927; Sydenham, London
- Died: 10 August 1991 (aged 64); Sydenham, London
- Occupations: Broadcaster, jazz critic, author
- Years active: 1950s–1991

Peter James Clayton (25 June 1927 – 10 August 1991) was an English jazz presenter on BBC Radio, jazz critic, and author. From October 1968 until his death in August 1991, Clayton presented jazz recordings, interviews, studio performances, and live performances on BBC Radio 1, 2, and 3, as well as the BBC World Service. He co-authored several books about music and jazz with Peter Gammond and was a frequent contributor to jazz magazines.

== Early life ==
The son of a railway clerk, Clayton was educated at Aske's School in South London. One day in 1942, "when I should have been doing my homework", he recalled hearing "broadcaster Spike Hughes playing jazz on the wireless and contracted chronic Boogie Woogie, an incurable condition whose twinges flair flair up even now in certain phases of the moon." After leaving school in 1945, he served three years in the RAF, serving mainly in Iraq and Kuwait. After demobilisation in 1948, Clayton was employed for a short while as a catering assistant with a hydroelectric scheme in the Scottish Highlands – "a porridge stirrer" was his job description – before joining the staff of Greenwich Public Library, where he remained for seven years. In 1956, he joined Decca Records as a cataloguer and migrated to writing sleeve notes. While an advertising copywriter, a job he greatly disliked, he became the editor of Jazz News, a magazine run with a small editorial budget.

== Broadcasting and writing career ==
BBC producer Teddy Warwick gave Clayton his first opportunity to broadcast on BBC Radio in 1962 and he soon became a regular broadcaster. He presented jazz music on BBC Radio 1 (then on 247 metres (1215 kHz) medium wave) from October 1968, with a programme called Jazz on One which was broadcast on Sunday evenings.

Clayton began to present Jazz Notes in 1970. In October 1973, the BBC launched Clayton's best remembered jazz programme, Sounds of Jazz, Sundays at 10 pm, with its own theme music composed by Laurie Johnson. His also presented a Sunday programme on Radio 2, Album Time.

According to Alyn Shipton in 2012: "Throughout the 70s and 80s, Peter [Clayton] became synonymous with jazz on BBC Radio." In addition to playing jazz records, Clayton organised and presented live jazz recordings with studio audiences, with sets lasting about 30 minutes recorded at BBC's Maida Vale Studios in London during the week. Frequent artists included clarinetist Dave Shepherd and his quintet, pianist Colin Purbrook (1936–1999), pianist Brian Lemon (1937-2014) and his octet, tenor saxophonist Danny Moss and his wife, vocalist Jeanie Lambe, and trumpeter Kenny Baker. The Mike Westbrook Orchestra made several broadcasts and filled the studio.

On 12 April 1974, Clayton interviewed the jazz pianist Oscar Peterson on BBC Radio 3. During the programme, Peterson performed and played some of his records. Clayton interviewed Sarah Vaughan on his Sounds of Jazz programme on 11 July 1977, when Vaughan sang a tribute to the music of George Gershwin.

On BBC Radio 3, he succeeded Steve Race as the presenter of the Saturday afternoon programme Jazz Record Requests, and played requests from an international audience on Jazz for the Asking on the BBC World Service. In a 2005 Jazz UK article about the BBC's influence on jazz in the UK, authors Brian Blain and John Fordham stated:

Informed presenters like the late Peter Clayton and Charles Fox served jazz superbly, and were looked on with real affection. For many years a long procession of bands, in all styles, made their way to the BBC's Maida Vale studios to record jazz, often in a near gig setting in front of enthusiastic audiences.

When Clayton became ill from cancer, Charles Fox took his place in 1990. Then Fox died on 9 May 1991, and Clayton resumed the show, recording segments at home from a wheelchair. His show Sounds of Jazz continued to be heard on BBC Radio 2 until his death. When Clayton died, ninety-three days after Fox died, Geoffrey Smith took over.

Throughout his broadcasting career, Clayton wrote several books with a colleague, Peter Gammond (1925–2019). He also ghost wrote Vera Lynn's autobiography.

== Selected published works ==
Books

- 101 Things, by Peter Gammond & Peter Clayton, London: Elek Books (1959); OCLC 30246604
- A Guide to Popular Music, by Peter Gammond & Peter Clayton, London: Phoenix Press (1960); OCLC 1194579, 314766655
- Dictionary of Popular Music, by Peter Gammond & Peter Clayton, Philosophical Library (1961); OCLC 851041
- Know about Jazz, by Peter Gammond & Peter Clayton, London: Blackie and Son (1963); OCLC 7955794

Bluffer Media Limited

- Bluff Your Way in Jazz, by Peter Clayton & Peter Gammond

1st ed., Ravette Books (1987)
2nd ed., London: Oval Books (1999); OCLC 42874470

- The Bluffer's Guide to Jazz, by Peter Clayton, Peter Gammond, John Lewis, London: Oval Books

3rd ed. (2002); OCLC 52159469
4th ed. (2007); OCLC 520448730, 905203381

- Jazz A-Z, by Peter Clayton & Peter Gammond, Guinness Books (Guinness Superlatives Ltd.) (1986); OCLC 15353474, 76750957

The Guinness Jazz Companion (rev. ed. of Jazz A–Z) (1989); OCLC 21118294

- 14 Miles on a Clear Night: An Irreverent, Sceptical, and Affectionate Book About Jazz Records, by Peter Clayton & Peter Gammond, Greenwood Press

Originally published by the Jazz Book Club, by arrangement with Peter Owen
Peter Owen (1965); OCLC 558885236
Reprint, Greenwood Press (1978); OCLC 3844338, 164784365

Liner, jacket, container, and program notes

- Tribute to Cole Porter, GNP Crescendo GNP-9004 (1980s re-release); OCLC 12952589
- Count Basie; Vol. I – Great Original Performances: 1932–1938, CDS Records (1992); OCLC 50337610
- Red Nichols and his Five Pennies, Ace of Hearts Records (1963); OCLC 221077483
- Canned Wheat by The Guess Who, RCA Victor (1969); OCLC 6149452
- Good Morning Rain, by Bonnie Dobson, performer; Ben McPeek, arranger, RCA Victor (1970); OCLC 13775385

Articles

- "Ten Years After: Peter Clayton Talks to Chris Barber," JazzBeat (magazine), Vol. 1, No. 4, June 1964, pp. 4–5; ISSN 0447-631X, OCLC 503996193, 752664415
- "Unsquare Peg," by Peter Clayton, Daily Telegraph, 21 June 1970
- "All Things Bright and Betjeman," by Peter Clayton, Hi-Fi News, April 1975, p. 119; ISSN 0142-6230
