= Steve Voce =

British journalist and music critic (1933–2023)

- Born: Steven Voce
- Known for: British journalist and music critic
- Spouse: Jenny Collins (died 2026)
- Presenting career
- Stations: BBC Radio Merseyside, BBC Radio 2
- Country: United Kingdom

Steve Voce (23 December 1933 – 23 November 2023) was a British journalist and music critic. He was best known for his broadcasting work on BBC Radio Merseyside and BBC Radio 2.

As well as writing obituaries for The Independent, he was a columnist for Jazz Journal, and presented the Jazz Panorama radio programme on BBC Radio Merseyside. Some of his titles included What'd I Say, It Don't Mean a Thing, Scratching The Surface and Still Clinging To the Wreckage. Voce was also a regular contributor to the BBC Radio 2 programme Jazz Notes

Voce was married to BBC Radio Merseyside presenter and producer Jenny Collins. She died in January 2026, at the age of 83.
