= Sinclair Traill =

British music critic (1905–1981)

Eric Sinclair Traill (1905 – 11 January 1981) was a British publisher, chief editor, and music critic of jazz. His career began in 1946, when he launched Pick Up as a locus for serious jazz criticism in Britain. In May 1948, Traill, using his own money, founded Jazz Journal and, for the rest of his life, served as its editor in chief. Jazz historian Roberta Schwartz states that Jazz Journal was not a new publication, but rather a name change for Pick Up.

== Affiliations ==
Traill was a founding director of Britain's National Federation of Jazz Organizations (NFJO), which had been formed under the auspices of Melody Maker in June 1948 to protect and further jazz interest in Britain. In March 1949, the directors of NFJO secured a promise from major record labels in Britain to make every effort to reissue jazz recordings. Traill, and another director, Max Jones, made sure the list included blues artists.

== Selected publications ==
- Just Jazz, by Sinclair Traill & Gerald Lascelles, P. Davies (publisher), four editions
1. (1957) OCLC 2754341
2. (1958) OCLC 16770378
3. (1959) OCLC 222998
4. (1960) OCLC 5655524
- Concerning Jazz, by Sinclair Traill, Faber and Faber (publisher)
1. (1957) OCLC 851241
2. (1957) OCLC 642055727
3. (1958) OCLC 723492538
4. (1957) OCLC 504419811
5. (1957) OCLC 753020307
- Play That Music: A Guide To Playing Jazz, edited by Sinclair Traill, The Jazz Book Club via Faber and Faber (publisher) (1958) OCLC 2199980
