= Max Jones (journalist) =

British jazz author, radio host, and journalist

Ronald Maxwell Jones (28 February 1917, London – 2 August 1993, Chichester) was a British jazz author, radio host and journalist.

== Life and achievements ==
Together with his brother Cliff, Jones taught himself to play the saxophone, before the two of them founded a dance band in 1930. Named "Campus Club Dance Band" it was semi-professional and when it was dissolved in 1935, Jones tried to establish himself as a professional musician, becoming a member of a combo led by trumpeter Johnny Claes, with musicians who played in the style of Coleman Hawkins.

In 1942 and 1943, Jones worked for the BBC radio programme Radio Rhythm Club; and in 1942, together with authors Albert McCarthy and Charles Fox, he founded the magazine Jazz Music, which became meritorious as it set out "to reassert the pioneering role of the African-American, to emphasise the music’s social dimensions, and to attack the glossy commercialism of big-band swing". Denis Preston was a friend and also a contributor.

Starting in 1944, Jones had a full-time job writing features for the British weekly music magazine Melody Maker in the column "Collectors’ Corner". In the years following he gained recognition as a proven expert on New Orleans Jazz, swing, and mainstream jazz.

A collection of his articles on musicians such as Coleman Hawkins, Johnny Hodges, Billie Holiday, and Mary Lou Williams was published as a book entitled Talking Jazz in 1987.

In 1971 Jones published a Louis Armstrong biography, Louis: The Louis Armstrong Story, together with John Chilton. Jones also wrote a number of liner notes, such as for the CD edition of the Kenny Clarke/Francy Boland Big Band and the Spirits of Rhythm.

Jones was the first jazz musician to become a professional journalist. Although he dealt exclusively with jazz in his publications, he was a model and a mentor for a younger generation of rock music critics and authors.

Jones was married to Betty Salberg and had one son.

== Publications ==
- LOUIS: The Louis Armstrong Story, 1900–1971 (with John Chilton), Boston: Little, Brown and Co. 1971. ISBN 0-306-80324-0
- LOUIS: The Louis Armstrong Story 1900–1971 (with John Chilton; new preface by Dan Morgenstern), New York City: Da Capo Press, 1988. ISBN 978-0-306-80324-6
- TALKING JAZZ, London: MacMillan, 1987. ISBN 0-333-43431-5
- JAZZ TALKING: Profiles, Interviews & Other Riffs (new preface by Stanley Dance), New York City: Da Capo Press, 2000. ISBN 0-306-80948-6
- Lee Collins, Mary Spriggs Collins, Frank Gillis, John W. Miner, Oh, Didn't He Ramble: The Life Story of Lee Collins (preface by Max Jones).
