= Jazz Forum (historic periodical) =

Jazz Forum Quarterly Review of Jazz and Literature
- Editor: Albert J. McCarthy (1920–1987)
- Categories: Music magazine
- Frequency: Quarterly
- Publisher: Delphic Press; Artin K. Shalian (ne Harountune Kourken Shaljian; 1892–1964), President
- Founded: 1946
- Final issue: 1947
- Country: England
- Based in: Fordingbridge, Hants
- Language: English
- OCLC: 52254545

Jazz Forum was a British-based "quarterly review of jazz and literature" founded and edited by Albert J. McCarthy (1920–1987) and published by the Delphic Press from 1946 — surviving only five issues until 1947. According to the jazz writers Peter Clayton and Peter Gammond, the publication offered good features by distinguished contributors. It was a short-lived but highly acclaimed experiment in linking jazz, poetry, literature, and graphic art in a post-World War II avant-garde British era. Several of the contributors were among the foremost Beat and modern writers of the time. The graphic art was also forward. The publication had useful discographies of then under-rated musicians. Contributors to the first 32-page issue included Stanley Dance, Charles Delaunay, Langston Hughes, Hugues Panassie, Roger Pryor Dodge in a mix of poetry and book reviews.
