= Charles Fox (jazz critic) =

English writer and broadcaster (1921–1991)

Charles Richard Jeremy Fox (1921 – 9 May 1991 in Weymouth) was an English writer and broadcaster who specialised in jazz.

== Life and career ==
Fox left school at 14 and trained as a draughtsman. His career in journalism began in the 1940s via letters to Melody Maker and jazz magazines of the era such as Jazz Music (edited by Max Jones and Albert McCarthy), Jazz Forum and Jazz Journal. He settled in London in the early 1950s working as a sub-editor on the Recorder newspaper and edited a poetry magazine entitled Ninepence founded with the poets Patrick Brangwyn and Christopher Logue. Fox was part of the group around McCarthy who founded Jazz Monthly magazine in 1955; the magazine continued publication until 1972. Fox's earliest broadcasting work was as a substitute presenter of Jazz Today on BBC Radio when its regular presenter, Steve Race, was ill and he began the Jazz in Britain programme which debuted new musicians. Fox lodged for many years with the family of musician Alexis Korner in Bayswater.

Fox contributed articles about jazz to the New Statesman. In addition, he occasionally wrote for The Guardian, The Sunday Times and The Gramophone. From the early 1960s onwards, he hosted the British radio programme Jazz Today. and regularly contributed interviews and documentary series to BBC Radio 3. He also sometimes substituted for Peter Clayton as presenter of Jazz Record Requests. He also wrote liner notes for British jazz record releases. As a member of the Music Advisory Committee of the British Council, he aided the early careers of musicians in gaining work overseas.

With McCarthy, he wrote Jazz on Record: A Critical Guide which was published in 1960, the same year as his own book on Fats Waller. in 1972 he authored a guide to the history of Jazz titled The Jazz Scene. Later in 1984, he co-wrote a guide to jazz recordings titled The Essential Jazz Recordings, i: Ragtime to Swing with Max Harrison and Eric Thacker.

== Bibliography ==
- Jazz on Record (with Peter Gammond and Paul Oliver) 1960, Hutchinson
- Jazz in Perspective, 1969, BBC
- The Jazz Scene, 1972, Hamlyn
- The Essential Jazz Records. Vol 1: Ragtime to Swing, 1984, Mansell (with Max Harrison and Eric Thacker)
