= National Jazz Centre =

The National Jazz Centre was a charity set up by the Jazz Centre Society in the 1980s to establish a national center for jazz in London.

The project attracted funding from BP and The Arts Council (Arts Council England); and £1,637,000 from Greater London Council as well as grants from The Pilgrim Trust and jazz enthusiasts. The site of the centre was to be on Floral Street in Covent Garden. Work started in 1982, converting a 19th Century fruit and vegetable warehouse, with anticipation that the new Centre would be complete by December 1983. A succession of set backs was thought to be resolved by 1984 and the re-opening was rescheduled to May 1985. A major royal Gala concert was hosted at the London Palladium, attended by Princess Diana. The opening event was shortly followed by the disclosure that the project had run out of money. The project had problems with financial management, with Westminster City Council launching a legal challenge to the previous GLC grant. This challenge was appealed, but upheld.
