= National Jazz Archive =

British jazz and blues research archive

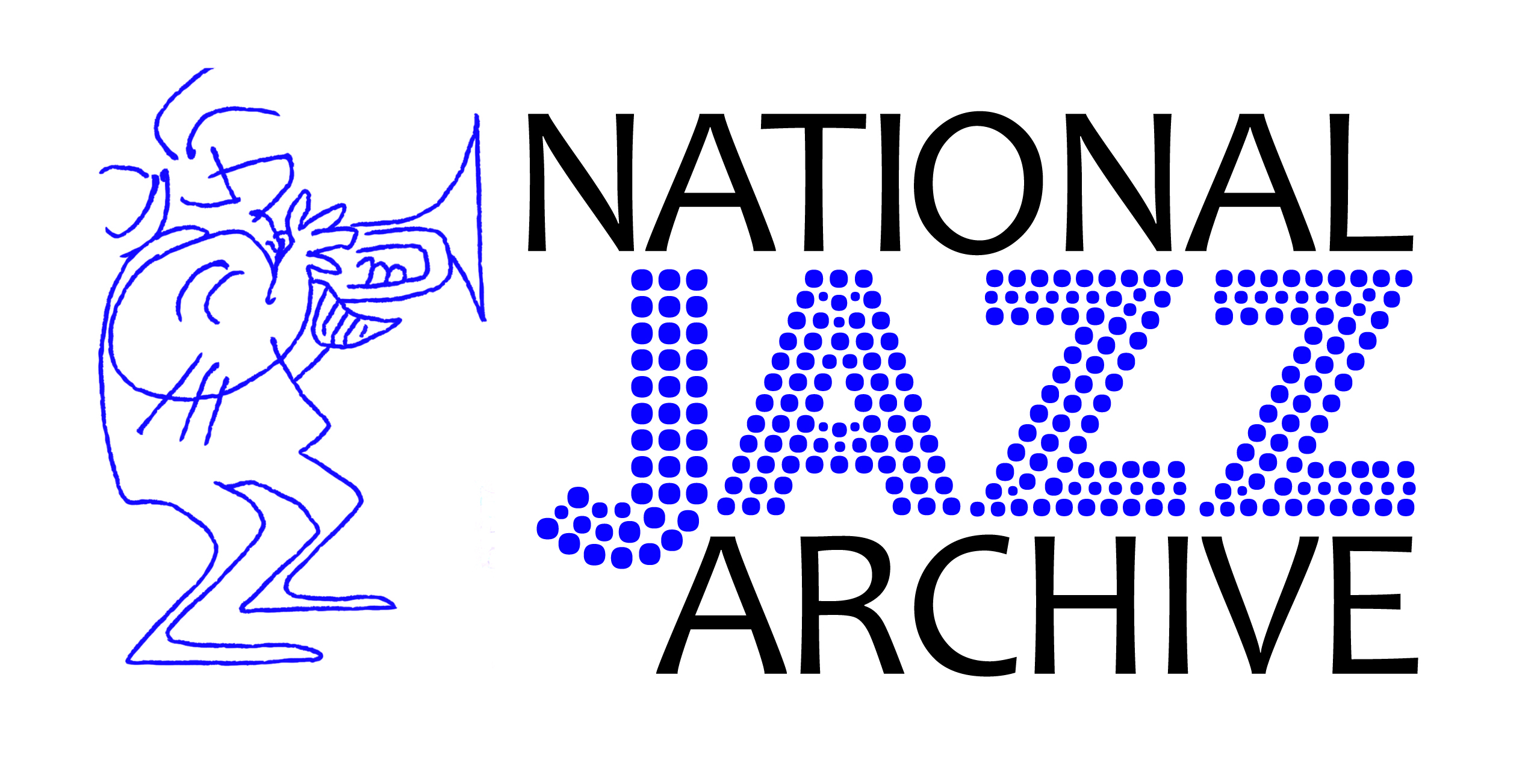
- The most recent logo as designed and released in 2018
- Established: 1988; 38 years ago
- Location: Loughton Library, Traps Hill, Loughton, IG10 1HD
- Coordinates: 51.6492°N 0.059°E
- Public transit access: Loughton tube station
- Website: nationaljazzarchive.org.uk

The National Jazz Archive is a collection of materials pertaining to jazz and blues that is kept at the Loughton Library in Essex, England. The archive was founded by British trumpeter Digby Fairweather in 1998 and contains visual and print materials from the 1920s to the present.

Patrons of the archive have included Baroness Amos, John Altman, Liane Carroll, Deirdre Cartwright, Gary Crosby, Paul Jones, Soweto Kinch, Cleo Laine, Michael Parkinson, Courtney Pine, John Prescott, Clare Teal, Kate Westbrook, and Mike Westbrook.

In 2011 the Archive was awarded a grant from the Heritage Lottery Fund. The grant enabled the cataloguing and digitisation of a substantial proportion of the collection, as well as a learning programme for schools and young people.

The National Jazz Archive is a registered charity and relies on support from donations and volunteers.

== Collections ==
The National Jazz Archive holds more than 4,000 reference books, specialist periodicals and bulletins. It also tells the story of jazz and blues in the UK through photographs, printed articles, memorabilia, artworks and personal papers.

The archive has built up a collection of books on jazz, blues, popular music and dance. Books date from 1914 to recent publications on the subject of jazz. Rarities include two early books on jazz: R.W.S. Mendl's The Appeal of Jazz (1927) and Stanley R. Nelson's All About Jazz (1934). Duplicate books are distributed to library outreach partners at institutes of higher education throughout the UK. All books are available for visitors to browse.

The archive also holds more than 800 journals dating from 1927 to the present. They reflect historical, cultural, social, and aesthetic developments in jazz. Although the archive holds an extensive collection of rare British journals, it also holds publications from around the world, including important titles from the US and Europe. These are a vital resource for those interested in knowing more about jazz and related popular music.

The archive also holds a poster collection documenting a wide range of promotional material. These include posters from major and small-scale British jazz festivals and concerts, international jazz events, and posters promoting album releases.

Important donations to the archive include unique items such as correspondence, written material and photographs. These belonged to eminent jazz musicians, enthusiasts, and professionals in the music industry. Of particular significance, the archive holds the collections of Mike Westbrook (pianist, composer and arranger), Ian Carr (trumpeter, composer, writer and educator), Charles Fox (author and broadcaster), Ken Colyer (trumpeter and band leader), John Cumming of Serious Music and Johnny Simmen (Swiss jazz historian).

== Events and activities ==
The National Jazz Archive runs a popular talks programme featuring leading musicians and personalities from the British jazz scene. Past speakers have included Michael Parkinson, Acker Bilk, Chris Barber, Sir John Dankworth, and Dame Cleo Laine.

Other events featuring talks and jam sessions have included musicians such as Buddy Greco, Alan Barnes, Paul Jones, John Altman, Roy Williams, and Simon Spillett.

The National Jazz Archive has online learning resources for schools and also participates in Heritage Open Days and has a presence at national jazz festivals.

== Related organisations ==
On 2 June 2016 its founder Fairweather launched a new charity named The Jazz Centre (UK). The newer charity celebrates the music's heritage, art and memorabilia and actively supports and promotes contemporary performance and education. Its library was founded using overstock from the National Jazz Archive.
