= Northway Books =

Northway Books (a.k.a. Northway Publications) is a publishing company based in London, UK. Northway specialises in biographies of musicians, and British social and cultural history. Its focus has been particularly on documenting jazz history in Britain but it has also published books on leading US musicians.

Since it began operations in 2000, Northway has produced autobiographies by saxophonist-bandleader Harry Gold, trumpeter-cornettist Digby Fairweather, saxophonist-club owner Ronnie Scott, bassist Coleridge Goode, trumpeters John Chilton and Leslie Thompson, clarinettist-saxophonist Vic Ash and alto saxophonist Peter King. Its catalogue also includes biographies of saxophonists Jackie McLean, Johnny Griffin, Hank Mobley and Joe Harriott, trumpeter Nat Gonella and bassist Henry Grimes, as well as books on the history of jazz in Britain by Jim Godbolt and Ian Carr and on jazz composition by Graham Collier. Northway has also published jazz-focused books by playwright Alan Plater and poet Chris Searle.
