= The Jazz Centre UK =

Charity Organization

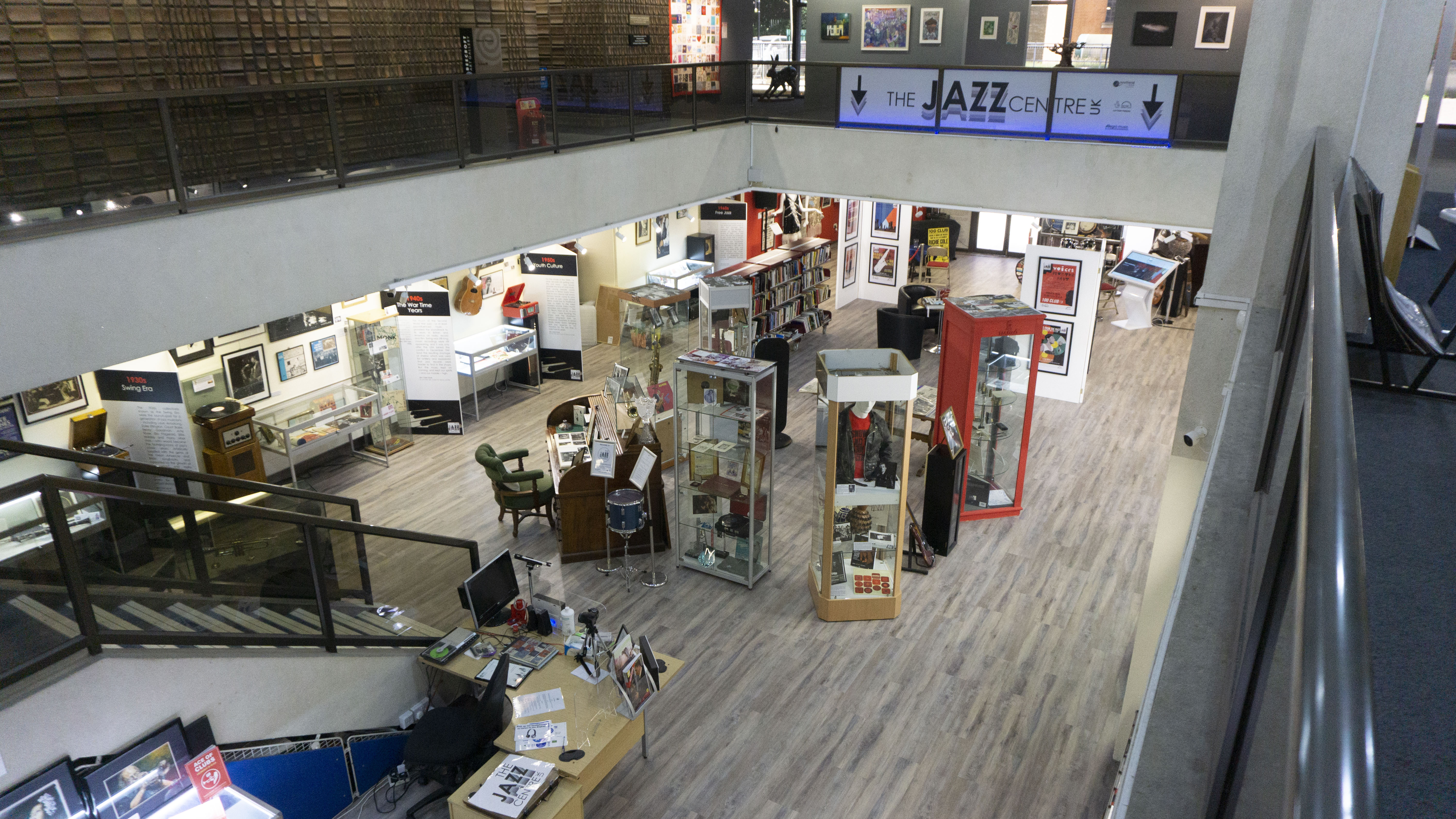
- Established: February 6, 2016
- Location: The Jazz Centre UK, Beecroft Art Gallery, Victoria Ave, Southend-on-Sea, Essex, SS2 6EX, UK
- Coordinates: 51.542°N 0.711°E
- Type: Cultural Centre
- Collections: LPs, artifacts
- Founder: Digby Fairweather
- Chairperson: Matthew Fisher
- Website: www.thejazzcentreuk.co.uk

The Jazz Centre UK is a cultural charity organization focused on jazz music, based in Southend-on-Sea, Essex. It was established in 2016 by British musician Digby Fairweather. The Centre's published aim is "to preserve, promote, and celebrate jazz music". In 2023, it renewed its relationship with Southend City Council and continues to operate from the Beecroft Art Gallery. The Centre houses a collection of jazz LPs, offers a live music program, and displays heritage and memorabilia such as Louis Armstrong's trumpet, the Humphrey Lyttelton collection, and Sir John Dankworth's first piano. The live music program includes performances by both international artists, like Daryl Sherman, and emerging musicians such as Emma Rawicz.

The organization is supported by musicians and industry professionals including Jamie Cullum, Zoe Rahman, Chris Philips, and Yolanda Charles. It also had support from the late Sir Michael Parkinson and political figures such as the late Sir David Amess during his bid to make Southend-on-Sea a city, along with the late Councillor Derek Jarvis.

== Projects ==
The Jazz Centre's projects include music education with local schools and grant funding for projects. The Jazz Centre UK has run two grant projects with the National Lottery Heritage Fund:

- The Influence of Jazz (2017) - £62,800 awarded to explore the heritage of jazz music.
- Jazz at the 100 Club: Bringing History to Life (2019) - £94,800 awarded to celebrates history of the 100 Club
