= Jazz Journal =

British jazz magazine

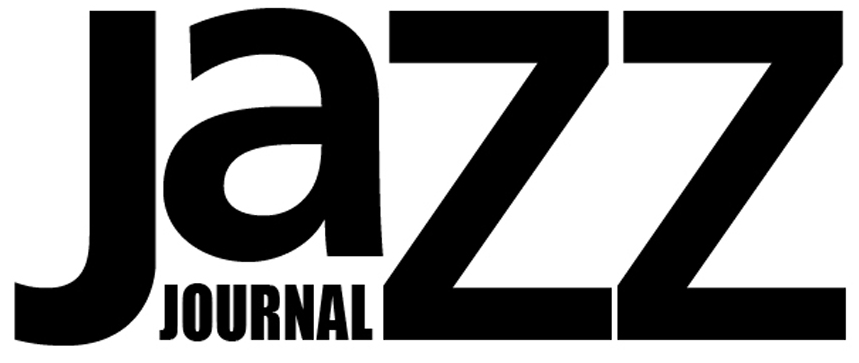

- Editors-in-Chief: Sinclair Traill (1946–81); Eddie Cook (1970–2009); Mark Gilbert (2009– )
- Categories: Music magazine
- First issue: Pick Up (1946); Jazz Journal (1948); Jazz Journal and Jazz & Blues (1974) Jazz Journal International (1977) Jazz Journal (2009-present)
- Company: 2009-Present; JJ Publishing Ltd; Invicta Press Ltd
- Country: United Kingdom
- Based in: London (1946–2009); Ashford, UK (2009–2018)
- Language: English
- Website: www.jazzjournal.co.uk
- ISSN: 2041-8833

Jazz Journal is a British jazz magazine established in 1946 by Sinclair Traill (1904–1981). It was first published in London under the title Pick Up, which Traill founded as a locus for serious jazz criticism in Britain. In May 1948, using his own money, Traill relaunched the magazine as Jazz Journal. Traill, for the rest of his life, served as its editor-in-chief. Jazz Journal is Britain's longest published jazz magazine.

== Ownership overview ==
In April 1977, Billboard Limited – then the publisher of Music Week and The Artist – acquired publishing rights to Jazz Journal (via lease agreement) from the magazine's owner, Novello & Company, Ltd. Cardfront Publishers Limited, a division of Billboard Limited, became the publisher; Mike Hennessey became director; Traill continued as editor-in-chief; and the publication was renamed Jazz Journal International (JJI).

JJI was presumed to have ceased publication in January 2009, after the death on 23 January 2009 of the publisher's wife and associate editor, Janet Cook. Eddie Cook, who had been publisher and editor-in-chief of JJI since 1978, wrote to JJI readers that, following the death of his wife, publication of the magazine would cease, and that the magazine was seeking a new owner. In April 2009, JJI's holding company, which at the time was Jazz Journal Publishing, absorbed a rival magazine, Jazz Review. Originally a monthly, Jazz Review had been published every two months and was owned by Direct Music Limited of Edinburgh, Scotland, who wished to end their publishing interests. Jazz Journal was absorbed into JJI and first published as such in May 2009 under Mark Gilbert (born 1955) – the last editor of Jazz Review, stepping in as editor of the new Jazz Journal. Gilbert had served as deputy editor of JJI from 1981 to 1999.

The December 2018 issue was the last print edition of Jazz Journal before the magazine moved entirely online from 19 January 2019, at https://jazzjournal.co.uk. A publisher statement explaining the move said:

The new Jazz Journal website continues the tradition of the print edition and will develop over time an archive holding material from the last seven decades of publication. Initially, at least, it will be a free to view service.

As well as enabling JJ to communicate to a wider readership, the online format, in comparison to the print edition, allows for faster publication of news and reviews, links to relevant sources, social media interaction and ready site search for favourite players, recordings, compositions, articles, etcetera. It is expected that the archive, combined with new material and functionality across desktop, tablet and mobile, will create an unparalleled resource for jazz fans, students and researchers.

With the same team of writers, Jazz Journal expects to maintain a lot of the old character in the new format

== Timeline ==
1946–1948
Sinclair Traill launched Pick Up magazine in January 1946 as a locus for serious jazz criticism in Britain and published it until 1948. Traill and T. B. Denby were the editors. According to Peter Clayton and Peter Gammond in their book Jazz: A–Z, "the publication was full of the self-righteous bickerings and puritanism of the period, but contained some valuable research and discography material; also an extensive 'wanted' and 'disposals' record section."
1948–1970
Traill, using his own money, founded Jazz Journal and, for the rest of his life, served as its editor in chief. Jazz historian Roberta Schwartz states that Jazz Journal was not a new publication, but rather a name change for Pick Up. The first issue of Jazz Journal was Vol. 1, No. 1, May 1948.
1953
Traill incorporated on 25 November 1953 as Jazz Journal Limited in Enfield, England
1960
Decca Records invested in Jazz Journal Limited in 1960 and sold its shares to Novello and Company Limited in 1970.
1970–??
Novello and Company Limited
1974
Novello changed the name to Jazz Journal and Jazz & Blues for 10 issues – from January 1974 (Vol. 27, No. 1) to October 1974 (Vol. 27, No. 10); Novello leased Jazz Journal three times:
1. April 1977: Cardfront Limited, a subsidiary of The Billboard Limited
2. 1979: Pitman Press Limited, guitarist Nevil Skrimshire (1923–2010) became editor
3. Eddie Cook (born 1928), who had been a manager at Pitman.
1982–2009
Eddie Cook (born 1928) purchased Jazz Journal Limited in instalments that began in 1982; Cook moved Jazz Journal to a new location, above The Canteen Jazz Club, a venue that operated from May 1979 to 1984, located in Covent Garden. Joe Bryan, owner of The Canteen, was made a director of Jazz Journal in exchange for offering free office space. Bryan sold his lease in 1984 to a group that converted the venue into a discothèque.
2009
JJI was acquired by a partnership between (i) JJ Publishing Limited (incorporated 23 March 2009), owned by JJI's new chief editor, Mark Gilbert, and (ii) Invicta Press Limited (incorporated 29 April 1960), a firm of Ashford printers. JJ Publishing acquired Jazz Journal Limited and absorbed a rival magazine, Jazz Review, in April 2009. Jazz Review was absorbed by the new JJI, which was first published May 2009 (Vol. 62, No. 3). Mark Gilbert, the new chief editor, had been the final chief editor of Jazz Review and had been the deputy editor of JJI. He had worked alongside Eddie Cook for 19 years.
2019
Following publication of the final print edition in December 2018, Jazz Journal moved entirely online to https://jazzjournal.co.uk on 19 January 2019.

== Jazz Journal archives ==
- In October 2009, Sarah Moy, daughter of Eddie Cook, donated materials from the JJI offices in Loughton to the National Jazz Archive, also situated in Loughton.

== Notable contributors ==
- Simon Adams
- Derek Ansell
- Ronald Atkins
- Bruce Crowther
- Roger Farbey
- Dave Gelly
- Fred Grand
- Andy Hamilton
- Gordon Jack
- Brian Morton
- Hugh Rainey
- Mike Tucker
- Steve Voce
- John White
