= Peter Gammond =

British music critic, writer and artist

Peter Gammond (30 September 1925 – 6 May 2019) was a British music critic, writer, journalist, musician, poet, and artist.

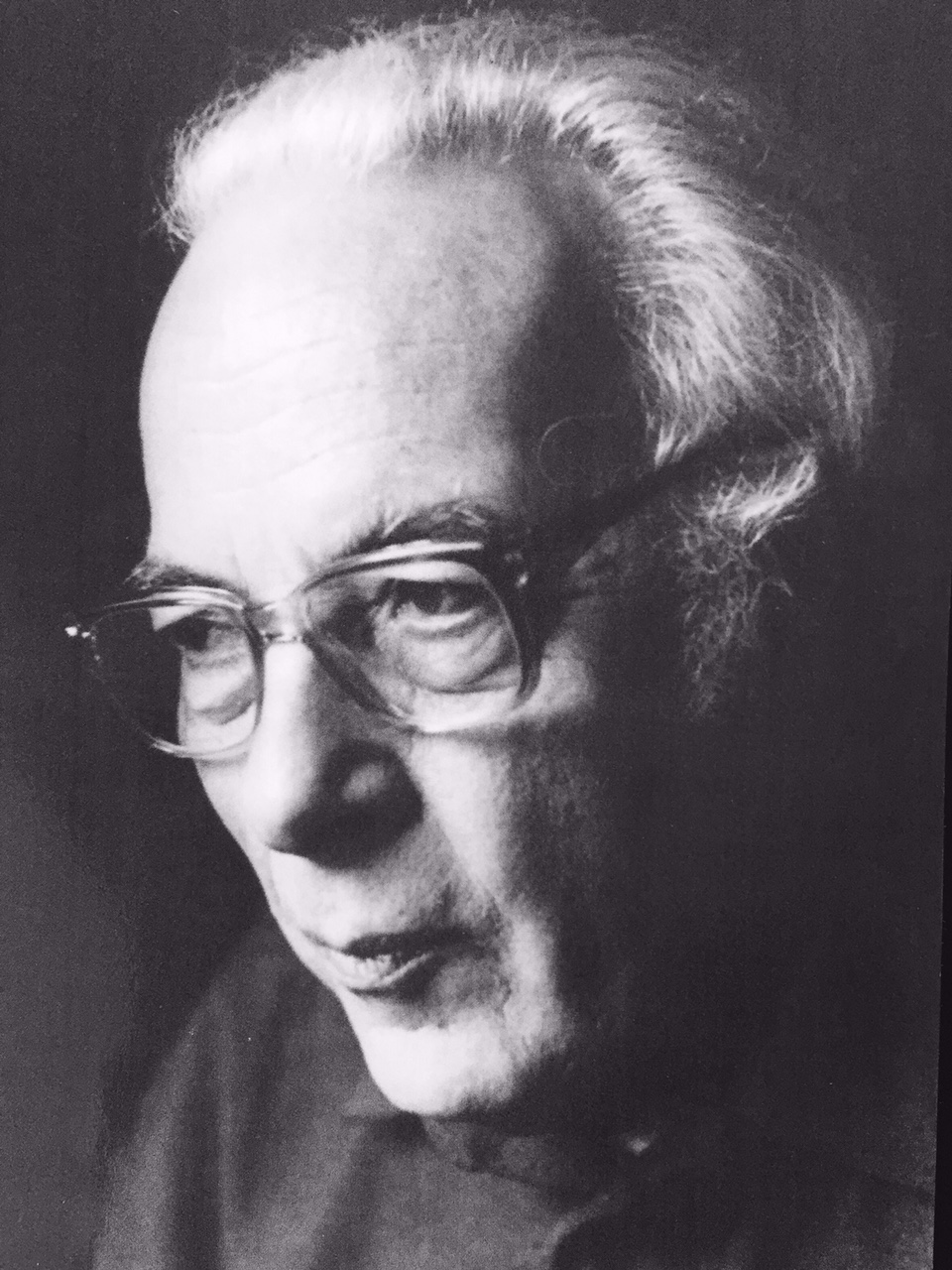
Peter Gammond

Peter Gammond was born in Winnington, Northwich, Cheshire. The son of John Thomas Gammond (1892–1970), a clerk, and Margaret Heald (1898–1985), Gammond inherited his musical interests from his father, who was a skilful and well-known amateur cellist and instrument repairer.

After early preparatory school in Weaverham, where he lived from 1930 to 1950, he was educated at Sir John Deane's Grammar School, where he attained distinctions in English and Art in the Higher School Certificate examinations. He won a scholarship to Manchester College of Art, having at the time an ambition to be a cartoonist, but at the age of 18 in 1943 was called up and served in the Royal Armoured Corps as a tank driver mainly in the Far East and India, ending with the 25th Dragoons, which was involved in the Hindu-Muslim conflict prior to Indian independence in 1947.

Upon returning to civilian life in 1947 Gammond continued his studies at Wadham College, Oxford, until 1950, where he read English. While at Oxford, he became well known in literary circles as a poet, appearing in three editions of Oxford Poetry, and as a cartoonist and writer with Cherwell. As poetry editor of the university magazine, The ISIS, Gammond worked under editors R. J. Harvey, Alan Brien, Robert Robinson, and Derrick Cooper. Gammond appeared in Oxford Viewpoint, where a study of his poetry by Irving Wardle was also published. During his time at Oxford, he composed and produced an operetta, Love and Learning, and played trombone in a university jazz band led by John Postgate.

On leaving Oxford, Gammond worked for a time in a West Country pub and as a rates assessor in Willesden, before joining the publicity department of the Decca Record Company in 1952, as an editor and sleeve-note writer, which led to his liaising closely with some of the leading classical and operatic performers of the time. He left the company in 1960 to become a freelance writer, critic and author. From 1964, Gammond edited Gramophone Record Review, later known as Audio Record Review, and remained as Music Editor when this was later incorporated into Hi-Fi News, until 1980. He died in May 2019 at the age of 93.

== Writing, publications and broadcasting ==
Gammond's publications number over forty books, among them studies of Schubert, Mozart, Offenbach and record collecting. His oeuvre also includes volumes on jazz, ragtime and music hall, with biographical studies of Duke Ellington and Scott Joplin, and the Oxford Companion to Popular Music. Record sleevenotes, for virtually every record company of the day, accounted for a large percentage of his freelance work and total over three hundred. Gammond is particularly well known for his six contributions to the Bluffer’s Guides, including the best-selling Bluff Your Way in Music, which launched the series in 1966. So influential was his contribution in this area that The Times dedicated a leading article to Gammond on his death, celebrating the way in which 'the pioneer of talking off the top of your head enriched the national conversation'.

As editor of Audio Record Review, Gammond instigated the annual 'Audio Awards', later the Hi-Fi News & Record Review Audio Awards', for 'services to the gramophone', which were the first of their kind for many years; recipients included Sir Neville Marriner, Sir Peter Pears, Dame Joan Sutherland, and Dame Janet Baker. Gammond was a regular broadcaster for BBC Radio, contributing criticism to programmes on jazz, providing interval talks (for instance on Gilbert and Sullivan), and featuring in the BBC Radio 3 'Building a Library' in Record Review on Saturday mornings, for instance with his choice of recordings of operetta and Johann Strauss. He also had an extended slot on the BBC Radio 2 arts programme, Round Midnight and on Forces Broadcasting. Gammond served as the British representative on the annual panel of adjudicators for the Grand Prix du Disque at Montreux in the 1970s and 1980s.

Gammond was a prolific poet. He was long an admirer of John Betjeman and was a past Chairman (1997-2002) and a Vice-President (from 2010 to 2019) of The Betjeman Society, the journal of which (The Betjemanian) he edited from 1996 to 2006. Gammond's publications include a number of volumes and bibliographic studies on Betjeman, and he scripted and appeared in the award-winning video Betjeman's Britain and its sequel Betjeman's London.

== Musical contacts ==
From his early days, but in particular during his time with Decca, Audio Record Review and Hi-Fi News, as well as in connexion with adjudicating the Grand Prix du Disque, Gammond encountered many of the most prominent musicians of the post-war decades. As a boy he met Elgar, he played bar billiards with Finzi while at Oxford, where he also lunched with Sir Thomas Beecham on the same day he hosted Dylan Thomas, and years later he dined with Stravinsky at the Savoy.

While compiling articles and publicity material he encountered such composers as Sir Malcolm Arnold, Benjamin Britten, Aaron Copland and Sir William Walton, and interviewed such singers as Kirsten Flagstad, Renata Tebaldi, Dame Joan Sutherland, Birgit Nilsson, Victoria de los Ángeles, Régine Crespin, Frederica von Stade, Sir Peter Pears, Carlo Bergonzi, Plácido Domingo and Luciano Pavarotti.

Gammond also interviewed and wrote about a number of eminent conductors, including Sir Malcolm Sargent, Leonard Bernstein, Antal Doráti, Josef Krips, Herbert von Karajan, Sir Georg Solti, Richard Bonynge and Sir Neville Marriner. Sir Yehudi Menuhin provided the preface to Gammond's The Meaning and Magic of Music, and he counted among his friends Daniel Barenboim and Jacqueline du Pré. Through his writing on jazz, Gammond met Duke Ellington and had extensive contact with André Previn.

== Other activities ==
Gammond gave talks for several recorded music societies, many of which he served as president, including the Sunbury Music Club, which was based in Upper Halliford until its disbandment in 2015. He was a long-standing and frequent contributor to The Friends of Torbay's annual 'Torbay Musical Weekend' at the Palace Hotel, Torquay since its inauguration in 1970 until 2007; he was appointed its vice-president in 2009 and served as president from 2014. It was at Gammond's invitation that musical conductors including Georg Solti addressed these gatherings.

In 1964, Gammond founded an informal music group which to this day meets on the first Tuesday of each month in members' houses. Taking place in the environs of Shepperton, Sunbury-on-Thames, Walton-on-Thames, Chertsey, Weybridge, and Woking, the meetings explore the musical repertoire through recordings and live performances.

Gammond was a member of Rotary International since 1962 and was President of the Shepperton Rotary Club from 1969 to 1970. He was much involved in local charitable work and in 1990 helped to found 'Care in Shepperton', a group of volunteers which offers neighbourly help and support to the indisposed, elderly and housebound; he served as its chairman from 1991 to 1996.

== Select bibliography ==
- Peter Gammond, ed. The Decca Book of Jazz. London: Frederick Muller, 1958.
- Peter Gammond, ed. Duke Ellington: His Life and Music. London: Phoenix House, 1958.
- Peter Gammond. Terms Used in Music: A Short Dictionary. London: Phoenix House, 1959.
- Peter Gammond and Peter Clayton. 101 Things: A Collection of Cartoons. London: Elek Books, 1959.
- Peter Gammond. A Guide to Popular Music. London: Phoenix House, 1960.
- Charles Fox, Peter Gammond, Alun Morgan; with additional material by Alexis Korner. Jazz on Record: A Critical Guide. London: Hutchinson, 1960.
- Peter Gammond, with Burnett James. Music on Record: A Critical Guide. London: Arrow Books, 1962–1964. Vol. 1, Orchestral Music A-L. Vol. 2, Orchestral Music M-Z. Vol. 3, Chamber and Instrumental Music (with supplement to Vols 1 and 2). Vol. 4, Opera and Vocal Music (with supplement to Vols 1-3).
- Peter Gammond. Know about Jazz. London; Glasgow: Blackie, [1963].
- Peter Gammond and Peter Clayton. 14 Miles on a Clear Night: An Irreverent, Sceptical, and Affectionate Book about Jazz Records. London: Peter Owen, 1966.
- Peter Gammond. Bluff Your Way in Music. London: Wolfe, 1966.
- Peter Gammond. The Meaning and Magic of Music. Feltham: Paul Hamlyn, 1968.
- Peter Gammond, comp. Your Own, Your Very Own!: A Music Hall Scrapbook. Shepperton: Ian Allan, 1971.
- Peter Gammond. One Man's Music. London: Wolfe, 1971.
- Peter Gammond, comp. and ed. Best Music Hall and Variety Songs. London: Wolfe, 1972.
- Peter Gammond. Musical Instruments in Colour. Poole: Blandford Press, 1975.
- Peter Gammond. Scott Joplin and the Ragtime Era. London: Abacus, 1975.
- Peter Gammond. The Illustrated Encyclopedia of Recorded Opera. London: Salamander Books, 1979.
- Peter Gammond. The Magic Flute: A Guide to the Opera. London: Barrie and Jenkins, 1979.
- Peter Gammond. The Good Old Days Songbook: Sixty Songs from the Golden Age of Music Hall, selected with an introduction and notes by Peter Gammond. London: British Broadcasting Corporation; EMI Music Publishing, 1980.
- Peter Gammond, ed. consultant. An Illustrated Guide to Composers of Classical Music. London: Salamander, c. 1980.
- Peter Gammond. An Illustrated Guide to Composers of Opera. London: Salamander, c. 1980.
- Peter Gammond. Offenbach: His Life and Times. Speldhurst: Midas, 1980.
- Peter Gammond and Raymond Horricks, ed. The Music Goes Round and Round: A Cool Look at the Record Industry. London: Quartet Books, 1980.
- Peter Gammond and Raymond Horricks, ed. Brass Bands. Cambridge: Stephens, 1980.
- Peter Gammond. Operas: Les Auteurs, les Compositeurs, les Librettistes, les Oeuvres, les Interpretes, les Disques. Paris: Fernand Nathan, 1981.
- Peter Gammond. Schubert. London: Methuen, 1982.
- Peter Gammond. A Critical Guide to the Best Recordings of Opera on Compact Disc, including Choral Works and Songs. London: Salamander Books, 1986. New York: Harmony Books, 1987.
- Peter Gammond. The Illustrated Encyclopedia of Opera. London: Peerage, 1986.
- Peter Gammond and Peter Clayton. Jazz A-Z. London: Guinness Books, c. 1986.
- Peter Gammond. Bluff Your Way in British Class. London: Ravette, 1986.
- Peter Gammond. Offenbach. London: Omnibus, 1986.
- Peter Gammond and Peter Clayton. Bluff Your Way in Jazz. London: Ravette, 1987.
- Peter Gammond. The Bluffer's Guide to Bluffing. London: Ravette, 1987.
- Peter Gammond. Duke Ellington. London: Apollo, 1987.
- Peter Gammond. The Encyclopedia of Classical Music. London: Salamander, c. 1988.
- Peter Gammond and Peter Clayton. The Guinness Jazz Companion. Enfield: Guinness, 1989.
- Peter Gammond. The Oxford Companion to Popular Music. Oxford: Oxford University Press, 1991.
- Peter Gammond. The Bluffer's Guide to Opera. London: Oval Books, 1993.
- Peter Gammond. The Harmony Illustrated Encyclopedia of Classical Music: An Essential Guide to the World's Finest Music. London: Salamander, 1995.
- Peter Gammond and John Heald, comp. A Bibliographical Companion to Betjeman. Guildford: The Betjeman Society, 1997.
- Peter Gammond. The Bluffer's Guide to Golf. London: Oval, 1999.
- Peter Gammond and John Heald. Sir John Betjeman 1906-1984: A Checklist of Writings by and about Him. Guildford: The Betjeman Society, 2005.
- Peter Gammond. The Little Book of Betjeman. Cirencester: Green Umbrella Publishing, 2006.
- Peter Gammond. The Day I Met Myself: Selected Poems. G2 entertainment, 2014.

Contributions to:

- The Decca Book of Opera. London: Werner Laurie, 1956.
- Charles Osborne, ed. The Dictionary of Composers. London: The Bodley Head, 1977.
- Denis Arnold, ed. The New Oxford Companion to Music. Oxford: Oxford University Press, 1983.
- The Great Composers and Their Music. Singapore: Marshall Cavendish, 1984–86.
- The Dictionary of National Biography 1986–1990. Oxford: Oxford University Press, 1990.
- Alison Latham, ed. The Oxford Companion to Music. Oxford: Oxford University Press, 2002.
- (The New) Oxford Dictionary of National Biography. Oxford: Oxford University Press, 2004. (20 entries by Gammond.)
- Introduction to Little Book of Musicals. Woking: Demand Media Ltd., 2014.

== Films and scripts ==
- Betjeman's Britain. Green Umbrella (Studio). Video, 1994. DVD, 2004.
- Betjeman's London. Green Umbrella (Studio). Video, 2000. DVD, 2004.
- With Lionel Blair. Introduction and script for Music Hall Days. Go Entertain (Studio). DVD, 2002.

== Select broadcasts ==
- The Jazz Scene: New Releases. BBC Light Programme. Monday 19 April 1963, 10.31 pm.
- The Jazz Scene: New Releases. BBC Light Programme. Sunday 5 January 1964, 10.31 pm.
- The Jazz Scene: New Releases. BBC Light Programme. Sunday 19 April 1964, 10.31 pm.
- Record Review: Building a Library: Operetta. BBC Radio 3. Saturday 27 June 1970, 11.30 am.
- Record Review: Building a Library: The Best of Johann Strauss. Saturday 22 February 1975, 9.5 am.
- Scott Joplin: A Genius Rediscovered. Peter Gammond in conversation with Peter Clayton. BBC Radio 4. 14 October 1977, 4.5 pm; re-broadcast Tuesday 15 July 1980, 4.10 pm.
- The Record Industry Blues: A Diagnosis. BBC Radio 3. Saturday 19 July 1980, 12.2 pm.
- Moments Musical. 8 programmes on musical theatre from ballad opera to Broadway and beyond. BBC Radio 2. Tuesday 8 September 1981, 8.0 pm; Tuesday 15 September 1981, 8.0 pm; Tuesday 22 September 1981, 8.0 pm; Tuesday 29 September 1981, 8.0 pm; Tuesday 6 October 1981, 8.0 pm; Tuesday 13 October 1981, 8.0 pm; Tuesday 20 October 1981, 8.0 pm; Tuesday 27 October 1981, 8.0 pm.
- The Magic of D'Oyly Carte. Interval feature on the separate careers and talents of William Schwenck Gilbert and Arthur Seymour Sullivan. BBC Radio 2, Saturday 16 March 1985, 8.20 pm.
