= John Chilton =

British jazz trumpeter and writer (1932–2016)

- Born: John James Chilton; 16 July 1932; London, England
- Died: 25 February 2016 (aged 83)
- Genres: Jazz
- Occupations: Musician, writer
- Instrument: Trumpet
- Years active: 1944–2016

John James Chilton (16 July 1932 – 25 February 2016) was a British jazz trumpeter and writer. During the 1960s, he also worked with pop bands, including The Swinging Blue Jeans and The Escorts. He won a Grammy Award for Best Album Notes in 1983.

== Biography ==
Chilton was born in London on 16 July 1932, to working-class parents (his father was a musical hall comedian) and was evacuated to Northamptonshire, where he began playing the cornet at the age of 12. He switched to trumpet at 17 and after doing national service in the RAF (1950–1952) he formed his own jazz band, playing at Butlins.

He worked in Bruce Turner's Jump Band from 1958 to 1963. A film of their exploits called Living Jazz (1961) was made by director Jack Gold. Chilton later appeared in Alex Welsh's Big Band.

He later worked with Wally Fawkes, also known as the cartoonist "Trog", and in January 1974 formed John Chilton's Feetwarmers, who began accompanying British jazz singer and writer George Melly. Together they made records and toured the world for nearly 30 years. Chilton won a Grammy Award for Best Album Notes on Bunny Berigan (1983) and was nominated in the same category in 2000 for The Complete Lester Young Studio Sessions on Verve.

As an author and researcher, Chilton published his Who's Who of Jazz: Storyville to Swing Street in 1970, and there were five updated editions until 1989. He followed this with Who's Who of British Jazz in 1997. He completed biographies of Billie Holiday, Sidney Bechet, Louis Jordan and Coleman Hawkins. He won a Grammy award for his writing on jazz, and in 2000 he won the British Jazz Award for Writer of the Year.

== Bibliography ==
- Louis: The Louis Armstrong Story (with Max Jones) (1971), ISBN 0-289-70215-1; (1988), ISBN 0-306-80324-0
- Ride Red Ride – the Life of Henry 'Red' Allen (2000), ISBN 0-8264-4744-9
- Roy Eldridge, Little Jazz Giant (2002), ISBN 0-8264-5692-8
- McKinney's Music – A Bio-discography of McKinney's Cotton Pickers (1978), ISBN 0-9501290-1-1
- A Jazz Nursery – The Story of Jenkins' Orphanage Band (1980), ISBN 0-9501290-2-X
- Teach Yourself Jazz (1979), ISBN 0-340-23847-X
- Stomp Off, Let's Go: The Story of Bob Crosby's Bob Cats and Big Band (1983), ISBN 0-9501290-3-8
- Who's Who of Jazz: Storyville to Swing Street (1970, 1972, 1978, 1985, 1989) ISBN see:
- Let the Good Times Roll: The Story of Louis Jordan and his Music (1997), ISBN 0-472-08478-X
- Billie's Blues – A Survey of Billie Holiday's Career (1975), ISBN 0-8128-1821-0
- The Song of the Hawk – The Life and Recordings of Coleman Hawkins (1990), ISBN 0-7043-2737-6
- Sidney Bechet – the Wizard of Jazz (1988), ISBN 0-19-520623-1
- Who's Who of British Jazz (1997), ISBN 0-304-33909-1; (2004), ISBN 0-8264-7234-6

== Autobiography ==
- Hot Jazz, Warm Feet. London: Northway Books, 2007. 2007. ISBN 978-0-9550908-3-7.

== Discography ==
- Nuts (1972)
- Son of Nuts (1973)
- It's George (1974)
- Making Whoopee (1982)
- Best of Live (1995)
- Anything Goes (1996)
- Goodtime George
- The Ultimate Melly, including guest Van Morrison (2006)
