= Albert McCarthy =

English jazz historian (1920–1987)

Albert J. McCarthy (1920 – 3 November 1987 London) was an English jazz and blues discographer, critic, historian, and editor.

McCarthy began listening to jazz in his teens, and edited publications of the Jazz Sociological Society in the 1940s. He edited the short-lived journal Jazz Forum until publication ceased in 1947.

McCarthy, along with Dave Carey (1914–1999) and Ralph Venables, attempted to catalogue all jazz artists in alphabetical order in the publication Jazz Directory. The first volume was published in 1949, and after several subsequent volumes, the editors found that so much had happened in the intervening years that they needed to revise the volumes already in print before continuing. Because of the size of this task, McCarthy's discography was never completed, though he worked on it for over 20 years.

McCarthy edited Jazz Monthly magazine (later Jazz and Blues) from 1955 to 1972, then started his own magazine, Mainstream, later in the decade. McCarthy also worked as a record producer for Black Lion, Atlantic, and RCA.

== Publications ==
- PL Yearbook of Jazz 1946, (editor), London: Poetry London Editions, 1946
- Jazzbook 1955, (editor), London: Cassell, 1955
- with Nat Hentoff (eds.) Jazz: New Perspectives On The history of Jazz by twelve of the world's foremost Jazz Critics and Scholars, New York, Rinehart 1959, Da Capo Press, 1975
- with Alun Morgan, Paul Oliver, Max Harrison (eds). Jazz on Record: a critical guide to the first 50 years, London: Hanover, 1968; and New York: Oak Publications, 1968.
- Big Band Jazz — The Definitive History of the Origins, Progress, Influence, and Decline of Big Jazz Bands, New York: Putnam's Sons, 1974, New York: Exeter Books, 1983.
- Louis Armstrong, London: Cassell, 1960; New York: Barnes 1961
- The Dance Band Era: the dancing decades from ragtime to swing 1910-1950, Radnor, Philadelphia: Chilton, 1971, rev. ed. 1982.
- with Dave Carey, Ralph Venables (eds). Jazz Directory – The Directory of Recorded Jazz and Swing Music, several volumes (unfinished), from 1949 (Discography)
- The Trumpet in Jazz, London: Dent, 1967.
