= It's Not Unusual =

1965 single by Tom Jones

Single by Tom Jones

from the album Along Came Jones (It's Not Unusual)
- B-side: "To Wait for Love" (Bacharach-David)
- Released: 22 January 1965 (UK); March 1965 (US)
- Recorded: 11 November 1964
- Studio: Decca Studios, London
- Genre: Orchestral pop; baião
- Length: 2:03
- Label: Decca (UK); Parrot (US)
- Songwriters: Les Reed; Gordon Mills
- Producer: Peter Sullivan

Tom Jones singles chronology
"Chills and Fever" (1964)	"It's Not Unusual" (1965)	"Once Upon a Time" (1965)

Music video
- "It's Not Unusual" (Lyric Video) on YouTube

"It's Not Unusual" is a song written by Les Reed and Gordon Mills, first recorded by a then-unknown Tom Jones, after it had first been offered to Sandie Shaw. He intended it as a demo for her, but when she heard it, she was so impressed with his delivery that she recommended he sing it instead.

The record was the second Jones single Decca released, reaching No. 1 on the UK Singles Chart in 1965. It was his first hit in the United States, peaking at No. 10 in May of that year. It was released in the US by Parrot Records and reached No. 3 on Billboard's easy listening chart. The song was first aired on pirate radio in the UK, as the BBC rejected it because of Jones' sexual image. In the US, Jones performed the song on three occasions on The Ed Sullivan Show.

"It's Not Unusual" is the theme song of his late 1960s–early 1970s television musical variety series, This Is Tom Jones. The initial studio version was released in 1995 as part of the compilation album The Legendary Tom Jones – 30th Anniversary Album.

== Musical arrangement and recording ==
The musical arranger was Les Reed. The guitarist has been cited as Jimmy Page of Led Zeppelin,, and Page lists the session in his online discography., but Reed has said the only guitarist was Joe Moretti, who also played on "Shakin' All Over" and "Brand New Cadillac". Drums were played by Scottish percussionist Andy White, who had previously drummed on a Beatles recording session, or possibly by Ronnie Verrell. Alan Grahame has also said he was involved. According to Jones's regular drummer, Chris Slade, there were four attempts with different drummers, including him, to get one with the right 'feel'. Though he was certain that his take was not chosen, he was unable to confirm which one of the others did make the final recording. Jones's group, "Tom Jones and the Squires", were missing their regular keyboard player for the session, so Slade (a future member of Manfred Mann's Earth Band, AC/DC, and The Firm with Jimmy Page and Paul Rodgers) ran across the street to the "La Giaconda" coffee house, and recruited the then-unknown Reginald Dwight (who later adopted the stage name Elton John) for the one-day recording session.

== Personnel ==
As was standard practice in the 1960s, session musicians were used instead of Jones's regular backing band. There are conflicting reports about who played on the record, but the most likely candidates are:

- Tom Jones – vocals
- Joe Moretti – guitar break
- Jimmy Page – lead guitar
- Vic Flick – guitar
- Andy White, or Ronnie Verrell, or Alan Grahame – drums
- Stan Barrett – percussion
- Kenny Salmon – organ
- Eric Ford – bass
- John Carter and Ken Lewis – backing vocals
- Stan Roderick, Kenny Baker, Bert Ezzard, and Ray Davies or Eddie Blair – trumpets
- Ronnie Ross, Bob Efford – tenor sax
- Harry Klein – baritone sax

== Charts ==
=== Weekly charts ===
Chart (1965)	Peak position
Australia (KMR)	3
Canada RPM Top Singles	2
Ireland (IRMA)	6
South Africa (Springbok)	1
UK	1
U.S. Billboard Hot 100	10
U.S. Billboard Easy Listening	3
U.S. Billboard Top Selling Rhythm and Blues Singles	26
U.S. Cash Box Top 100	10

Chart (1987)	Peak position
Ireland (IRMA)	15
UK Singles (OCC)	17

=== Year-end charts ===
Chart (1965)	Rank
South Africa	9
U.S. Billboard Hot 100	64
U.S. Cash Box	52

== Certifications ==
Region	Certification	Certified units/sales
Denmark (IFPI Danmark)	Gold	45,000^{‡}
New Zealand (RMNZ)	Platinum	30,000^{‡}
Spain (Promusicae)	Gold	30,000^{‡}
United Kingdom (BPI)	Platinum	600,000^{‡}
^{‡} Sales+streaming figures based on certification alone.

== Cover versions ==
- The Impressions recorded a version in 1965.
- The Dells also recorded a version in 1965 and released it as the title track of an LP on Vee-Jay records in Chicago. It was released as the B-side to their original recording of Stay in My Corner.
- Glen Campbell recorded the song on his 1965 album The Big Bad Rock Guitar of Glen Campbell.
- Brenda Lee recorded the song for her 1965 album Too Many Rivers.
- Bobbi Martin released her version on her 1965 album I Love You So.
- Los Bravos recorded a live version which was released as a single in 1966.
- Jackie Trent included her version on her 1966 album Yesterdays.
- In 1966, South African trumpeter Hugh Masekela included the song to his album Hugh Masekela's Next Album.
- The Knickerbockers present the song in the 1966 Movie "Out Of Sight"
- The Supremes recorded a version of this song for their Supremes A' Go-Go album, but was not included. It was recently released on a collection of Supremes' previously unreleased recordings and rarities.
- Florence Ballard (of The Supremes and featured on their version) recorded a version of this song in 1968 for her debut solo album, You Don't Have To, that was shelved by ABC Records and left unreleased until the release of The Supreme Florence Ballard CD.
- Vikki Carr recorded the song for her 1968 album Don't Break My Pretty Balloon.
- Italian rock singer Little Tony performed a local version with the title "Non è normale " ("It's not usual") [sic].
- American alternative band Wild Colonials covered the song, which appeared on their album Reel Life vol 1 (2000) and on the soundtrack of the Ellen DeGeneres film Mr. Wrong.
- Five Iron Frenzy covered this song on their live album Five Iron Frenzy LIVE: Proof That the Youth Are Revolting, and later released a studio recorded version on their album All the Hype That Money Can Buy.
- Cher recorded a version of the song on her 1966 record, The Sonny Side of Cher.
- Writer Les Reed and his orchestra also recorded an instrumental version on their 1971 record, Colour Me.
- Filipino singer/artist Sam Sorono (1950–2008) covered this song on his 1978 Sings Tom Jones' Greatest Hits LP album with EMI Records.
- The Wedding Present recorded a version included on the UK remastered re-release of their 1989 album, Bizarro.
- The alternative rock band Belly covered the song on the 1994 soundtrack of the movie With Honors.
- The alternative rock band Wild Colonials version appeared in the 1996 movie and soundtrack to "Mr. Wrong"
- Clare Teal in a jazz style on her 2012 album The Many Sides of Clare Teal.
- Temuera Morrison covered the song on his 2014 album Tem.

== The Fresh Prince of Bel-Air ==
The song enjoyed a resurgence in the mid-1990s, as it was used in the hit sitcom The Fresh Prince of Bel-Air on several occasions. It typically features Carlton Banks, one of the lead characters, lip-syncing to the lyrics and performing comedic choreography (which came to be known as "the Carlton dance"). Jones had guest-starred on the show on a few occasions, also performing and dancing alongside Carlton in the episodes. Jones later made a guest appearance in the third season episode "The Alma Matter" as Carlton's guardian angel, who performed the song with Carlton's actor Alfonso Ribeiro.

== Bibliography ==
- Thompson, Gordon (2008). Please Please Me: Sixties British Pop, Inside Out. OUP USA. ISBN 9780195333251.
