= Tony Lee (pianist) =

British jazz pianist

- Born: Anthony Leedham Lee; 23 July 1934; Whitechapel, London, England
- Died: 2 March 2004 (aged 69) Esher, Surrey
- Genres: Jazz
- Occupation: Musician
- Instrument: Piano
- Years active: 1950s-2004
- Formerly of: Phil Seamen; The Tony Lee Trio

Tony Lee (born Anthony Leedham Lee; 23 July 1934 – 2 March 2004) was a British jazz pianist, who played with Tommy Whittle, Tom Jones, Dusty Springfield, Barney Kessel, Sonny Stitt, Eddie "Lockjaw" Davis, Terry Smith, Tubby Hayes, Dick Morrissey and the drummer Phil Seamen.

== Biography ==
Lee was born in Whitechapel, London. His father was a singer. He learned the rudiments of the piano from his elder brother, Arthur, who was self-taught and preferred to use the black keys rather than the white. As a consequence, he became fluent in keys such as G flat and B natural. He played as a regular for many years with a trio comprising bassist Tony Archer and drummer Martin Drew or Terry Jenkins at The Bull's Head in Barnes, London, a few miles from his home in Kingston upon Thames, Surrey.

During a visit by the former Count Basie tenor-saxophonist Billy Mitchell who came to play at the Bull's Head, both Mitchell and Lee got on so well together that the Bull's Dan Fleming organised for both of them to tour in the US in 1984. Fleming said at the time, "Lee could bring out the best in everybody and he drew you into the music."

Despite his limited knowledge of musical theory, he was considered a talented pianist.

He appeared on at least two recordings with Seamen - Phil Seamen Now! . . . Live! (1968) and on Phil Seamen Meets Eddie Gomez (1968), a live recording featuring US bassist Eddie Gómez. His solo debut, Electric Piano (1971), earned many comparisons to the works of Burt Bacharach. He made at least four other LPs, including Tony Lee Trio (British Jazz Artists Vol. 1), (1976), Street of Dreams (1979), Hey There (1992) and The Tony Lee Trio Live at the Station (2002), prior to his death from cancer in 2004.

He had a long-lasting association of some 40 years with bassist Tony Archer in the Tony Lee Trio. Lee and Archer also played together in the sextet The Best of British Jazz formed in the early 1970s with Jack Parnell (drums), Kenny Baker (trumpet), Don Lusher (trombone) and Betty Smith (tenor sax). The sextet recorded two albums - The Best of British Jazz and The Very Best of British Jazz.

As with many pianists from the 1950s and 1960s Lee was influenced by Erroll Garner, Oscar Peterson and Art Tatum.

== Personal life and death ==
Lee died on 2 March 2004 in Esher, Surrey. He is survived by his wife Olga and one stepson Anthony.
