= The Jazz Series =

Television series produced between 1979 and 1981

The Jazz Series is a Scottish television series produced between 1979 and 1981. Each of the four series had a single presenter and a house band with whom guest musicians would play each week.

In January 2011, Scottish Television published all twenty one episodes on YouTube, but these have in the interim been removed along with the playlist page which formerly existed.

== Series One ==
Date aired : January 1979

Presenter: Annie Ross

House band: Pat Smythe Septet

=== Episodes ===
Episode One: Tommy Whittle, Duncan Lamont, Bobby Wellins, Jimmy Hastings, Scott Madden

Songs performed

- "Work song" by Oscar Brown, Jr., Nat Adderley - performed by Annie Ross;
- "Honeysuckle Rose" by Andy Razaf, Fats Waller - performed by Annie Ross;
- "Children's game" by Antonio Carlos Jobim - performed by Tommy Whittle;
- "The shadow of your smile" by Paul Francis Webster, Johnny Mandel - performed by Scott Madden;
- "Morning mist" by Hank Johnson - performed by Jimmy Hastings (flute);
- "Four brothers" by Jimmy Giuffre - performed by Annie Ross, Duncan Lamont, Bobby Wellins, Tommy Whittle, Jimmy Hastings.

Personnel on camera

Annie Ross, vocal, master of ceremonies; with Eddie Blair, trumpet; Cliff Hardie, trombone; Duncan Lamont, tenor sax; Laurie Hamilton, electric guitar; Neil Cameron, acoustic double bass; Alan Ganley, drums; + guests Tommy Whittle, Bobby Wellins, tenor sax; Jimmy Hastings, flute, ts: + Scott Madden, piano.

Episode Two: Bobby Wishart, Ron Mathewson, Cathy Brawley

Songs performed

- "Milestones" by Miles Davis,
- "Give me a lass" arr Pat Smythe,
- "The champ" by Dizzy Gillespie (PS);
- "Scarborough Fair" by Paul Simon, Art Garfunkel (BWC);
- "Little green apples" by Bobby Russell (CB);
- "Bye bye blackbird" by Mort Dixon, Ray Henderson (AR).

Personnel on camera

Annie Ross, vocal, master of ceremonies; The Pat Smythe Septet:- George Chisholm, trumpet, fluegel horn; Cliff Hardie, trombone; Duncan Lamont, tenor sax, penny whistle; Pat Smythe, piano; Laurie Hamilton, electric guitar; Neil Cameron, acoustic double bass; Bobby Orr, drums; + Ron Mathewson, acoustic double bass; + The Bobby Wishart Circle with Cathy Brawley, vocal.

Episode Three: Mike Carr Trio, Jimmy Deuchar

Songs performed

- "Minor event";
- "My ship" by Ira Gershwin, Kurt Weill (JD);
- "Love's last goodbye" by Mike Carr (MC);
- "I hear music" by Frank Loesser, Burton Lane (AR, JD).

Personnel on camera

Annie Ross, master of ceremonies, vocal; with The Pat Smythe Septet:- George Chisholm, trumpet, fluegel horn; Cliff Hardie, trombone; Duncan Lamont, flute, tenor sax; Pat Smythe, piano; Laurie Hamilton, electric guitar; Neil Cameron, acoustic double bass; Bobby Orr, drums; + Jimmy Deuchar, fluegel horn; + The Mike Carr Trio.

Episode Four: Andy Park Band, Denny Wright, Don Harper

Songs performed

- 4. "Air mail special" by Benny Goodman, Jimmy Mundy, Charlie Christian;
- "Tea for two" by Irving Caesar, Vincent Youmans (AR);
- "The quiet one" by Don Harper (DH, DW);
- "Jazz me blues" by Tom Delaney

Personnel on camera

Annie Ross, vocal, master of ceremonies; with The Pat Smythe Septet:- Eddie Blair, trumpet; Cliff Hardie, trombone; Duncan Lamont, tenor sax; Pat Smythe, piano; Laurie Hamilton, electric guitar; Neil Cameron, acoustic double bass; Bobby Orr, drums; + Don Harper, violin, with Denny Wright, guitar; + The Andy Park Band.

Episode Five: Bob Brookmeyer, Jim Hall

Songs performed

- "Jumpin' at the Woodside" by Count Basie (AR);
- "Blue dove" (BB, JH);
- "Just one of those things" by Cole Porter (AR).

Personnel on camera

Annie Ross, vocal, master of ceremonies; with The Pat Smythe Septet:- Eddie Blair, trumpet; Cliff Hardie, trombone; Duncan Lamont, reeds; Pat Smythe, piano; Laurie Hamilton, electric guitar; Neil Cameron, acoustic double bass; Bobby Orr, drums; + Bob Brookmeyer, v-trb, and Jim Hall, electric guitar.

== Series Two ==
Date aired : Jan - Feb 1980

Presenter: George Chisholm

House band: George Chisholm and his Gentlemen of Jazz, Carol Kidd

=== Guests by episode ===
Episode One: Elena Duran, George Penman Jazzmen

Episode Two: Don Lusher, Head

Episode Three: Morrissey Mullen Band, Duncan Findlay

Episode Four: David Snell, Bobby Wishart, Jackie Murray

Episode Five: Jack Emblow, John McLevy, Jimmy Feighan

== Series Three ==
Date aired : Summer 1980

Presenter: Ronnie Scott

House band: The Ronnie Scott Quartet

=== Guests by episode ===
Episode One: Carol Kidd, Johnny Griffin, Jimmy Feighan

Episode Two: Morrissey Mullen Band

Episode Three: Kenny Wheeler, Bobby Wishart

Episode Four: Georgie Fame

Episode Five: Julie Amiet, Stan Tracey Quartet

Episode Six: Buddy de Franco, Terry Gibbs

== Series Four ==
Date aired : Spring 1981

Presenter: Ronnie Scott

House band: the Ronnie Scott Quartet

=== Guests by episode ===
Episode One: Louis Stewart, Barbara Thompson's Paraphernalia

Episode Two: George Coleman

Episode Three: Stan Tracey Octet

Episode Four: John Etheridge, Ric Sanders, Colin Bates

Episode Five: John Dankworth
