= Keith Kelly =

Keith Kelly may refer to:

- Keith Kelly (footballer) (born 1983), Jamaican football player
- Keith Kelly (singer), 1950s–1960s English pop singer, guitarist and songwriter
