= Verrell =

Verrell is a surname. Notable people with the surname include:

- Cec Verrell (born 1958), American actress
- Ronnie Verrell (1926–2002), English jazz drummer
