= Duncan Campbell (trumpeter) =

British trumpeter (1926–2013)

- Born: Duncan Campbell; 31 May 1926; Springburn, Glasgow, Scotland
- Died: 12 December 2013 (aged 87) Dorchester, Dorset, England
- Genres: Easy listening, instrumental, jazz, big band
- Occupation: Musician
- Instrument: Trumpet
- Years active: 1942–?

Duncan Campbell (31 May 1926 – 12 December 2013) was a British trumpet player who played with Ted Heath and his Orchestra, Ronnie Scott, Syd Lawrence and the BBC Big Band. He was married to June Pressley, Elvis Presley's cousin and regular of the Ivy Benson Band.

== Early life ==
Duncan Campbell was born in Springburn, in Glasgow. Interested in music from a young age, he would often listen to his father play the cornet, as well as listening to his father's collection of Jazz records on a wind up gramophone. His collection consisted of the works of Louis Armstrong, Henry Red Allen, Paul Whiteman, Count Basie and Harry Lauder. The first classical record he bought was by Frederick Delius and titled "On Hearing the First Cuckoo in Spring". Duncan recalled: "I used to play it looking out of the window on a very rainy day and even now, when I play that song in the car I have to stop and cry. It’s so good and yet, so sad."

Whilst his father was out at work, Campbell taught himself to play on his father's cornet, and as he left school with no qualifications, he decided music was the next step in his life. By this point, he had already joined the Boys' Brigade and Scouts. Whereas he liked the Scouts uniform, it was the brass band of the Boys' Brigade that Campbell enjoyed, later playing with the Salvation Army Band with his father; Duncan playing the cornet and his father playing the tenor horn.

== Professional career ==
At sixteen, he joined his father's band, but left to travel with the bands playing the ballrooms in Glasgow. He played with about five bands, whose performance was broadcast on the radio most Saturday nights. One particular band belonged to Charlie Pressley, Campbell's future father-in-law.

Campbell later joined Lou Preager's orchestra at the Hammersmith Palais. Wally Smith, Don Lusher and his ex-wife Eileen Orchard were also a member of Preager's band, recording records with His Master's Voice. When everyone had gone home, Campbell used to play "Lover Man, Where Can You Be?" by Sarah Vaughan in the Band Room at the Hammersmith Palais. Many years later, he would work with Vaughan.

Preager and his orchestra were invited by the Queen Mother to play at Buckingham Palace, where they were all introduced personally to each member of the Royal Family. Around this time, Preager also wrote solos for Campbell to play which were later recorded on wax type records. Nevertheless, Campbell later joined the Tito Burns Band; front line up was Campbell on trumpet, Ronnie Scott on tenor sax and Johnny Dankworth on alto sax. He toured the country with them before joining Teddy Foster's Band, and later Cyril Stapleton's, band on lead trumpet. Finally, Duncan joined Ted Heath and his Orchestra, where he never missed a gig or recording in its fifty years of performances.

== Ted Heath era ==
When Ted Heath and his music, started, it was mainly instrumental and relied upon drummer Jack Parnell and compere Paul Carpenter for vocals. Ted Heath also had a number of singers, including Lita Roza, Dickie Valentine and Dennis Lotis. Campbell started on third trumpet, and contributed to the world-class drive of the famous Heath brass section. He played many jazz solos on record and in concert, as well as being one the band's on-stage clowns, providing comedy interjections and falsetto vocals on numbers such as "Tequila".

=== Carnegie Hall ===
In April 1956, Heath arranged his first American tour. This was a ground breaking reciprocal agreement between Heath and Stan Kenton, who would tour Britain at the same time as Heath toured the U.S. The tour was a major negotiated agreement with the British Musicians' Union and the American Federation of Musicians, which broke a 20-year union deadlock. Heath contracted to play a tour that included Nat King Cole, June Christy and the Four Freshmen that consisted of 43 concerts in 30 cities (primarily the southern states) in 31 days (7,000 miles) climaxing in a Carnegie Hall concert on 1 May 1956. At this performance, the band's instrument truck was delayed by bad weather. The instruments finally arrived just minutes before the curtain rose. The band had no time to warm up or rehearse. They went on stage "cold". There were so many encore calls at the Carnegie Hall performance that Nat King Cole (who was backstage, but not on the bill) had to come out on stage and ask people to leave.

== Stage and film ==
Campbell expressed that the Ted Heath Band was good discipline, but after Heath's death in 1969, Campbell had reservations that the band would never be the same again, leaving to pursue session work that was available on television and the odd gig. However, by this time he had already started a musical career in film, most notably in Agatha Christie's The Mirror Crack'd, starring Elizabeth Taylor, Kirk Douglas and Tony Curtis.

In the West End, Campbell had also worked on several shows such as Bubbling Brown Sugar, and the Andrew Lloyd Webber show Song and Dance with Wayne Sleep, which ran for two years. After this, he worked on the Steven Spielberg film Indiana Jones and the Temple of Doom. More recently, Campbell has worked on the film Entrapment with Sean Connery.

== Later career ==
Campbell later rejoined Ted Heath's Orchestra under Don Lusher. He was also a staff player in the BBC Radio Orchestra and BBC Big Band, until he retired from the BBC aged 60. In the 1990s, he had made three trips to Japan with the Ray McVay Band, performing 'The Glenn Miller Show' with singers and dancers. In 2003, he bought himself a new trumpet; "It wasn't far short of the price of my first house. I've been a full time musician since I was sixteen years old, so at eighty one I am more than happy just to have come this far. I still just love playing so I'll keep on playing as long as the chops keep going!"

== Personal life and death ==
Campbell and his wife, June, retired to Pitlochry, Scotland in 2008. June Campbell died in 2010, so in 2011 Duncan moved to Weymouth to live with his daughter, Karen. Duncan Campbell died in Dorchester, Dorset on 12 December 2013, at the age of 87.
