= Barbara Jay =

British jazz singer (1932–2026)

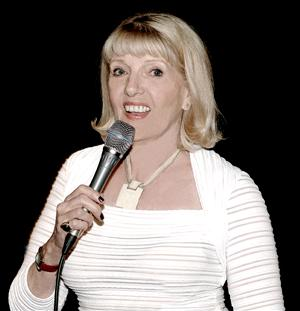
- Jay in 2009

Background information
- Born: Barbara Jones; 15 August 1932; Cardiff, Wales
- Died: 15 October 2026 (aged 94) London, England
- Genre: Jazz
- Occupation: Singer
- Labels: Tee-Jay; Spotlite
- Spouse: Tommy Whittle

Barbara Jay (née Jones; 15 August 1932 – 15 October 2026) was a British jazz singer.

== Life and career ==
Barbara Jones was born on 15 August 1932 in Cardiff, Wales, but grew up in London, England. Her father played trumpet with many of the leading bands of the time. She took naturally to singing, and, by the 1960s, she was working with top British jazz musicians, including Ronnie Scott and Don Lusher.

As a solo jazz singer, Jay shared the billing at Ronnie Scott's Jazz Club with Horace Silver, Pharoah Sanders, George Chisholm and Dave Holland. More recently she has worked with Jon Hendricks in cabaret on the Saga Ruby cruise ship and also on MV Oriana.

In 1970, she was chosen to sing with Benny Goodman and His Orchestra on an extensive European tour and appeared in many major cities, including Paris, Milan, Copenhagen and Zurich. She also performed at the Carnegie Tavern in New York where she was accompanied by Ellis Larkins. In 1993, she devised the successful "Ella Fitzgerald Songbook Show" which was performed at major venues and festivals throughout Britain and also with her own quartet at the Pizza on the Park in Knightsbridge, London. She appeared frequently with her husband, saxophonist Tommy Whittle (died October 2013), and performed extensively on British television and radio. She has also appeared at many European festivals including Nice and Cork. In December 2012, she appeared as a contributor to the BBC Four TV documentary Len Goodman's Dancing Feet: the British Ballroom Story, describing her experiences singing for dance bands in the 1950s.

Jay died from complications of dementia on 15 October 2026, aged 94.

== Discography ==
- The Nearness of You (Tee-Jay, 1982)
- Memories of You (Tee-Jay, 1988)
- Just Friends (Spotlite, 1997)
- The Ella Fitzgerald Songbook Revisited (Spotlite, 2000)
- Reminiscing with Barbara Jay (Spotlite, 2003)
