= Ted Heath (bandleader) =

British musician and big band leader (1902–1969)

Background information
- Also known as: Ted
- Born: George Edward Heath; 30 March 1902; Wandsworth, London, England
- Died: 18 November 1969 (aged 67) Virginia Water, Surrey, England
- Genres: Big band, jazz
- Occupations: Bandleader, composer, musician
- Instrument: Trombone
- Years active: 1916–1969
- Labels: Decca, London

George Edward Heath (30 March 1902 – 18 November 1969) was a British musician and big band leader.

Heath led what is widely considered Britain's greatest post-war big band, recording more than 100 albums, which sold over 20 million copies. The most successful band in Britain during the 1950s, it remained in existence as a ghost band long after Heath died, surviving in such a form until 2000.

== Musical beginnings ==
After playing tenor horn at the age of six, encouraged by his father Bert, a trumpeter and the leader of the Wandsworth Town Brass Band, Heath later switched to trombone. Both often played together on numerous dance band recordings of the 1920s and 1930s.

Earning a living for his family in the post-war years he, and his brother Harold with three other musicians, formed a band that played to commuters outside London Bridge Station before winding their way along the streets in London to a location outside the Queen's Hall Gardens venue. It was here that Heath's professional career began as he was spotted on the street and asked to play with the Jack Hylton Band who had a residence there. He did not last long, not having the experience required, but it gave him the ambition to pursue a career as a professional musician.

== 1920s ==
His first real band gig was with an American band on tour in Europe – the Southern Syncopated Orchestra – which had an engagement in Vienna, Austria and needed a trombone player. The drummer for this band, Benny Payton, taught Heath all about jazz and swing. Heath had to pay his own way back from Austria when the band ran out of money. Heath heard Bunny Berigan, Tommy Dorsey and Jimmy Dorsey and Paul Whiteman when they toured Europe.

He next played with the Metro-Gnomes, a small band fronted by Hylton's then-wife Ennis Parkes. In the late 1920s, Heath again joined Hylton's larger stage band (also being present on a number of 12-inch "concert" recordings), staying until 1930. Around this time, he also began to play for a number of other dance orchestras.

== 1930s ==
In 1928, he joined Bert Ambrose's orchestra at The May Fair Hotel in London and played there until 1935, when he moved on to Sydney Lipton's orchestra at the Grosvenor House Hotel. Ambrose, a strict disciplinarian, taught Heath how to be a bandleader. It was during this time that Heath became the most prominent trombone player in Britain, renowned for his perfect tone. He kept playing on numerous recordings as a studio musician, although he concentrated his efforts on the Ambrose band after 1932.

In September 1939 the outbreak of the Second World War caused the immediate disbandment of the Sydney Lipton Band, which was on tour in Scotland at the time. Heath, his wife Moira and children went back to London. In late 1939, Heath joined Maurice Winnick's The Dorchester hotel band.

During the late 1930s and early 1940s, Heath also played as a sideman on several Benny Carter sessions.

== 1940s ==
In 1940, Heath joined Geraldo's orchestra, and played numerous concerts and broadcasts during the war travelling to the Middle East to play to the Allied Forces-based there. He often became one of the "boys" in Geraldo's vocal group, 'Three Boys and a Girl'.

In 1941, Geraldo asked his band members to submit a favourite tune to include in their broadcasts. Heath had composed a song "That Lovely Weekend", after his wife had written him a poem on a rare weekend together amongst his war travels, and he set this to music. Heath suggested "That Lovely Weekend" to Geraldo and it was orchestrated, with Dorothy Carless on vocal, and was an immediate wartime hit. The royalties from this song and another composition "Gonna Love That Guy" allowed Heath to form his own band.

== Ted Heath and his Music ==
Heath was inspired by Glenn Miller and his Army Air Force Band, and spoke with Miller at length about forming his own band when Miller toured Britain with the United States Army Air Force Orchestra. Heath admired the immaculate precision of the Miller ensemble, and felt confident that he could emulate Miller's great success with his own orchestra.

In 1944, Heath talked Douglas Lawrence, the Dance Music Organiser for the BBC's Variety Department, into supporting a new band with a broadcasting contract. Lawrence was sceptical as Heath wanted a much larger and more jazz orientated band than anyone had seen in Britain before. This band followed the American model, and featured five saxophones, four trombones, four trumpets, piano, guitar, double bass and drums. The new Ted Heath Band, originally organised as a British "All Star Band" playing only radio dates, was first heard on a BBC broadcast in 1944.

In 1945, the BBC decreed that only permanent, touring bands could appear on radio. So Ted Heath and his Music was officially formed on D-Day, 1944.

In late 1945, American bandleader Toots (Tutti) Camarata came to UK as musical director for the film London Town (1946) starring comedian Sid Field. This film was intended to be Britain's first attempt to emulate the American film musicals of studios such as MGM and Camarata commissioned Heath to provide his band as the nucleus for the film's orchestra. The film was not a success.

Heath arranged a stint at the Winter Gardens at Blackpool in 1946, a Scandinavian tour, a fortnight at the London Casino with Lena Horne, and backed Ella Fitzgerald at the London Palladium.

Huge popularity quickly followed and Heath's Band and his musicians were regular Poll Winners in the Melody Maker and the NME (New Musical Express) – Britain's leading music newspapers. Subsequently, Heath was asked to perform at two Royal Command Performances in front of King George VI in 1948 and 1949.

In 1947, Heath persuaded impresario Val Parnell, uncle of the band's star drummer Jack Parnell, to allow him to hire the London Palladium for alternating Sundays for his Sunday Night Swing Sessions. The band caused a sensation and eventually played 110 Sunday concerts, ending in August 1955, consolidating the band's popular appeal from the late 1940s. These concerts allowed the band to play much more in a jazz idiom than it could in ballrooms. In addition to the Palladium Sunday night concerts the band appeared regularly at the Hammersmith Palais and toured the UK on a weekly basis.

== 1950s and US tour ==
In April 1956, Heath arranged his first American tour. This was a reciprocal agreement between Heath and Stan Kenton, who would tour Britain at the same time as Heath toured the United States. The tour was a major negotiated agreement with the British Musicians' Union and the American Federation of Musicians, which broke a 20-year union deadlock. Heath contracted to play a tour that included Nat King Cole, June Christy and the Four Freshmen that consisted of 43 concerts in 30 cities (primarily the southern states) in 31 days (7,000 miles) climaxing in a Carnegie Hall concert on 1 May 1956. At this performance, the band's instrument truck was delayed by bad weather. The instruments finally arrived just minutes before the curtain rose. The band had no time to warm up or rehearse. There were so many encore calls at the Carnegie Hall performance that Nat King Cole (who was backstage, but not on the bill) had to come out on stage and ask people to leave.

During the tour, Nat King Cole was attacked on stage in Birmingham, Alabama by a group of white segregationists. Heath was so appalled he nearly cancelled the remainder of the tour but was persuaded by Cole to continue. They remained firm friends until Cole died in 1965 and collaborated musically on many occasions. Heath later successfully toured the US again and also toured Australia and Europe.

The 1950s was the most popular period for Ted Heath and His Music during which a substantial repertoire of recordings were made. In 1958 nine albums were recorded. He became a household name throughout the UK, Europe, Australasia and the US. He won the New Musical Express Poll for Best Band/Orchestra each year from 1952 to 1961. Heath was asked to perform at a third Royal Command Performance for King George VI in 1951, and for Elizabeth II in 1954.

He was the subject of This Is Your Life in 1959 when he was surprised by Eamonn Andrews at the BBC Television Theatre. During this period, Heath and his band appeared in several more films (following London Town) including Dance Hall (1950); It’s a Wonderful World (1956) and Jazz Boat (1960).

== 1960s ==
Heath used Decca's Phase 4 Stereo recording methods in the early 1960s. He continued to commission a huge number of original scores and arrangements and some of his biggest US chart successes came during this time. He performed continuously and successfully until his health faltered in 1964, suffering a cerebral thrombosis on his 62nd birthday, and collapsing on stage in Cardiff. Thereafter the band toured less, but continued to record several albums.

== Professional relationships ==
In addition to Cole, Heath established close personal and professional relationships with Woody Herman, Count Basie, Marlene Dietrich, Johnny Mathis and Tony Bennett. He worked with Sarah Vaughan, Ella Fitzgerald Lena Horne; June Christy; Mel Torme; The Four Freshmen; Donna Hightower and others. His band members included Ronnie Scott, an early member of the band, the pianist Stan Tracey, trumpeters Kenny Baker, Eddie Blair, Duncan Campbell, sax players Don Rendell and Tommy Whittle, trombonists Don Lusher and Wally Smith, drummers Jack Parnell and Ronnie Verrell and double bass Johnny Hawksworth. The addition of singers Dickie Valentine, Lita Roza and Dennis Lotis in the '50s gave the band more teenage appeal. He commissioned scores from all the top arrangers of the era with more than 800 original arrangements as part of the band's library. Arrangers included Tadd Dameron, George Shearing, Reg Owen, John Keating; Kenny Graham; Ken Moule; Bob Farnon; Woolf Phillips; Ron Roullier; Bill Russo; Johnny Douglas; Ron Goodwin; and Ralph Dollimore.

== Personal life ==
Heath was married twice, firstly in 1924 to Audrey Keymer, who died in 1932. There were two sons from the marriage, Raymond and Robert. His second marriage was to Moira Tracey, a ballet dancer who appeared in one of the first television transmissions by John Logie Baird on the BBC, and became a prolific lyricist and songwriter. She received a special award for services to television, the 'Freedom of the City of London' in recognition of her services to songwriting and a British Academy of Songwriters, Composers and Authors 'Gold Badge Award'. She died on 24 January 2000 in Weybridge, Surrey, England, UK. There were four children from this marriage, Martin, Valerie, Nicholas and Timothy.

Two of Heath's sons, Nick Heath and Tim Heath, continued the musical and entertainment tradition in the family by becoming successful artiste managers, record company and music publishing company owners, and Nick Heath continues his entertainment business career as a music producer and owner of Birdland Records. James Heath (Heath's grandson, Nick Heath's son) is a film and music video director.

== Death, and continuation of band through the 1970s, 1980s and 1990s ==
He died in 1969 at the age of 67, but the band reformed after a Thames Television tribute broadcast in 1976 with the approval of the Heath family, and went on performing concerts. Initially some early 1970s recordings were recorded under the musical direction of Roland Shaw, Ralph Dollimore and Stan Reynolds, but thereafter all recordings were supervised by trombonist Don Lusher, who led the band for 25 years until 2000, with mostly original Heath alumni. The final concert in December 2000, was a sell out at London's Royal Festival Hall, attended by most Heath personnel past and present and the Heath family. The band at that performance was made up almost entirely of players who had played under Ted Heath's leadership. Numerous radio and television tributes have been broadcast over the years.

The band compared favourably with the best of America's big bands in the opinion of Count Basie in his testimonial to Heath on Heath's 21st Anniversary album, and is generally accepted as the best swing band that Britain ever produced.

== Archives ==
Leeds Conservatoire in Leeds, Yorkshire, United Kingdom has a wide collection of Ted Heath recordings and memorabilia available for research.

Guildhall School of Music and Drama in London has established, in conjunction with the Heath family, "The Ted and Moira Heath Award" for promising jazz musicians.

== Sources ==
- John Robert Brown, A Concise History of Jazz p. 90
- Ian Carr, Digby Fairweather, & Brian Priestley Jazz: The Rough Guide 2nd edition. ISBN 1-85828-528-3
- Roy Carr. A Century of Jazz. p. 24
- Leonard Feather, "Heath, Edward 'Ted'", in the Encyclopedia of Jazz (New York City:Horizon Press, 1955), p. 157
- Ron Fritts, Ken Vail. Ella Fitzgerald: The Chuck Webb Years and Beyond p. 93
- Peter Gammond. The Oxford Companion to Popular Music – 1991
- Lesley Gourse. Sassy: The Life of Sarah Vaughan
- Max Harrison, Charles Fox, Eric Thacker. The Essential Jazz Records – Ragtime to Swing p. 215
- Moira Heath. I Haven't Said Thanks: The Story of Ted and Moira Heath ISBN 978-0-9534729-0-1
- Ted Heath. Listen to My Music: An Autobiography. London:Muller, 1957
- Paul Henry. Saxophone
- J. Humphries. Music Master Albums Record Catalog 1991
- Roger D. Kinkle, "Heath, Ted". The Complete Encyclopedia of Popular Music and Jazz, 1900-1950.
- Colin Larkin The Guinness Encyclopedia of Popular Music ISBN 0-85112-721-5
- Colin Larkin, The Virgin Encyclopedia of Fifties Music
- William F. Lee. American Big Bands. p. 285
- Gene Lees, Nat Hentoff. You Can't Steal a Gift: Dizzy, Clark, Milt and Nat
- Henry Martin, Keith Waters. Jazz: The First 100 Years (House Publishers, 1974), pp. 1077–1078.
- Joseph Murrells. The Book of Golden Discs ISBN 0-214-20032-9
- Tony Parker. The Greatest Swing Band in the World – Ted Heath ISBN 978-0-9521782-0-0
- Catherine Parsonage. The Evolution of Jazz in Britain 1880–1935. p. 196
- George Shearing, Alyn Shipton. Lullaby of Birdland. p. 87
- John Shepherd. Continuum Encyclopedia of Popular Music of the World
- William Emmett Stodwell, Mark Baldin. The Big Band Reader. p. 135
- Leo Walker. The Big Band Almanac. p. 174
- Chris Woodward. The London Palladium: The Story of the Theatre and its Stars. p. 176
- Scott Yanow. Swing.
- Billboard magazine, 12 May 1956 – Ted Heath Carnegie Hall review
- The Ted Heath Music Appreciation Society of Great Britain
- "Big Band Profiles: Ted Heath", Jazz Professional, jazzprofessional.com.
- "Ted Heath," The Space Age Pop Music Page, spaceagepop.com.
- Big Band Library
- UK Apologetics
