= The Bull's Head, Barnes =

Pub in London, England

Coordinates: 51.4737°N 0.2511°W

The Bull's Head
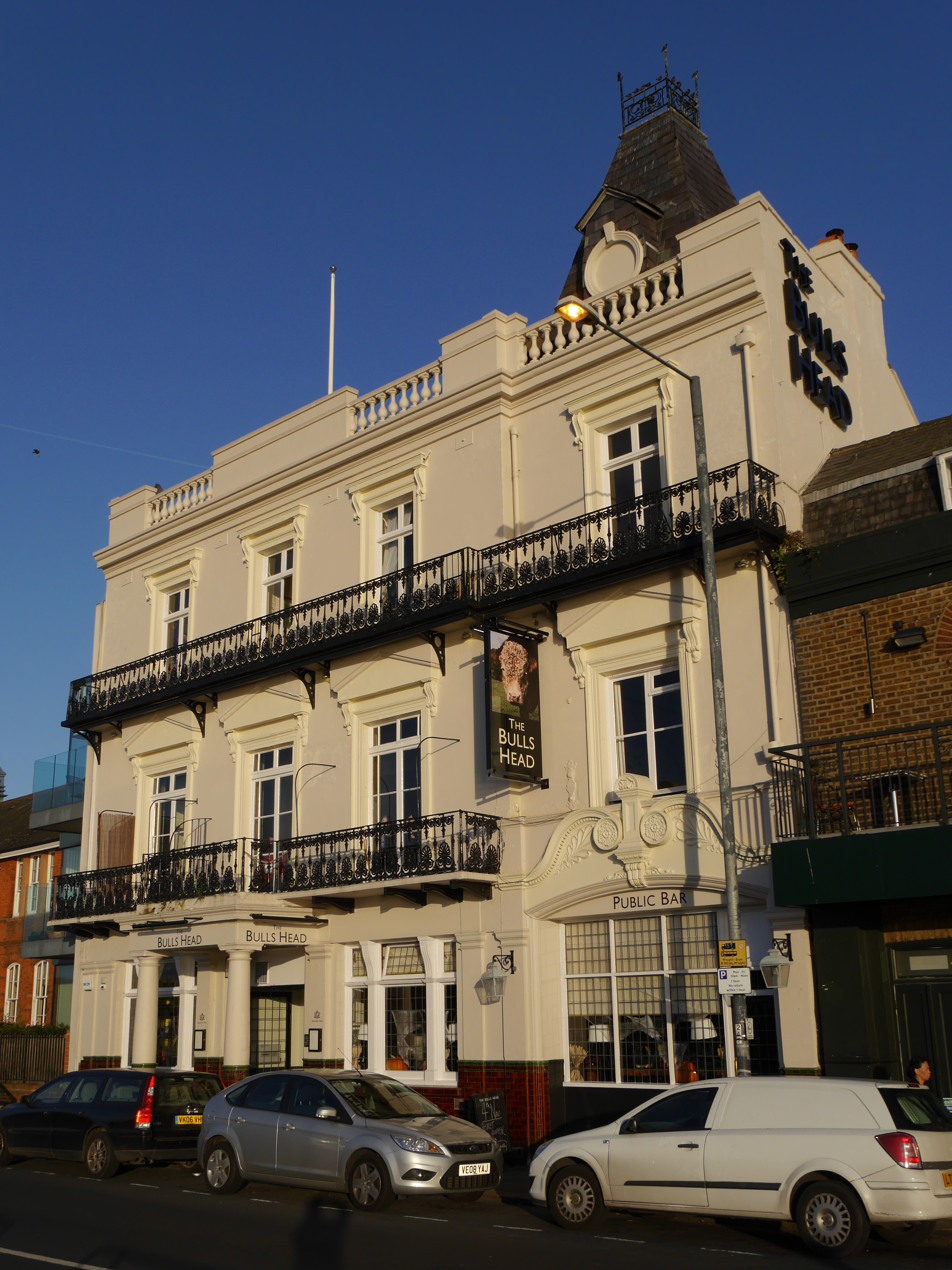
- Interactive map of The Bull's Head
- Location: Barnes; London, SW13; England, United Kingdom
- Owner: Young & Co
- Capacity: 70
- Type: Music and food
- Events: Jazz, blues, soul, rock
- Public transit: Barnes Bridge

Construction
- Opened: 1959; 67 years ago

Website
- www.thebullsheadbarnes.com

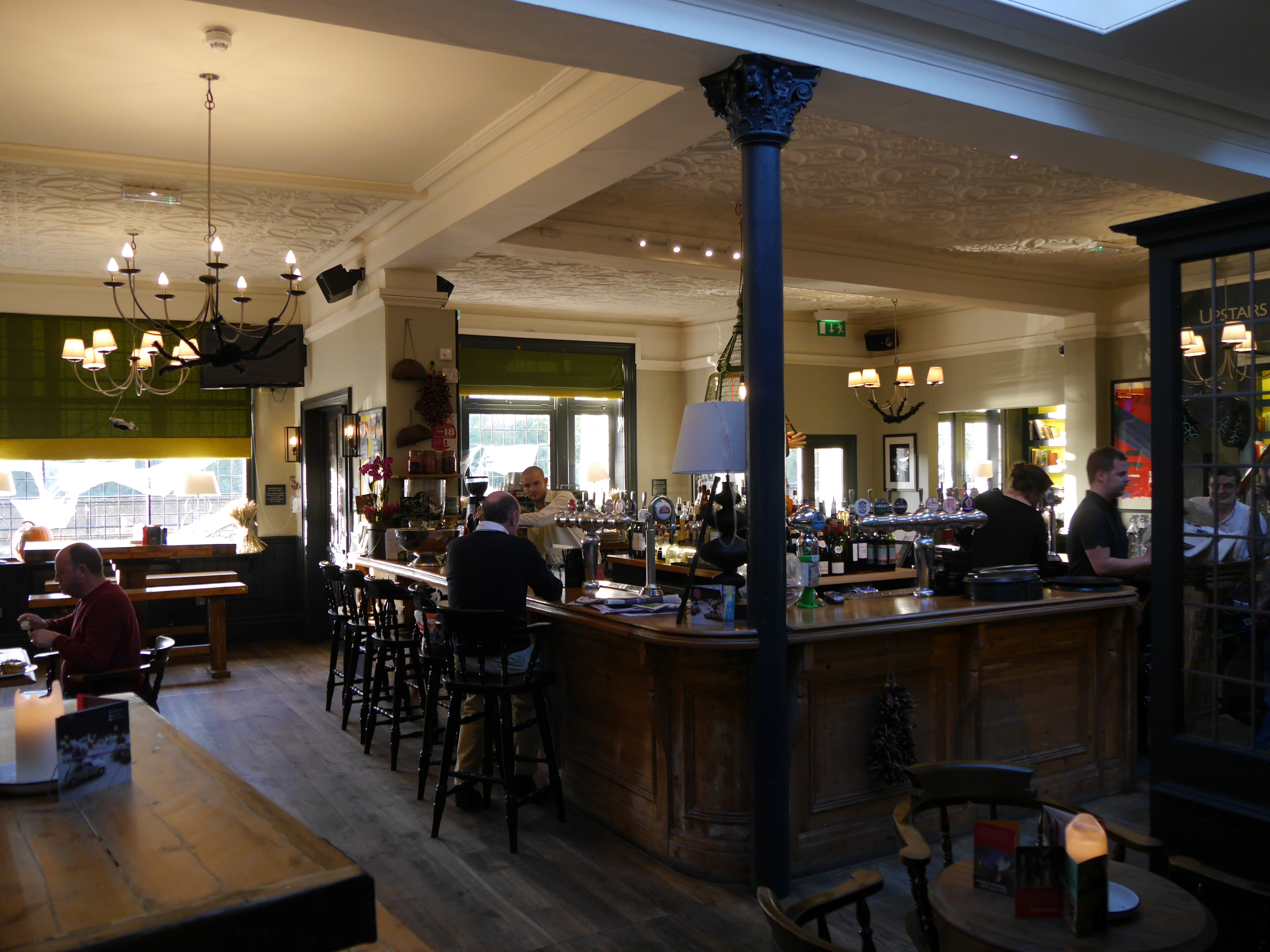
Bull's Head interior, 2014

The Bull's Head, also known as The Bull, is a pub in Barnes in the London Borough of Richmond upon Thames, England. It hosts live music in an attached music room that has a seated capacity of 70 people.

Overlooking the river Thames, it was one of the first and most important jazz venues in Britain. The Bull's original music room was opened at the same time as Ronnie Scott's Jazz Club and became known as the "suburban Ronnie Scott's". The front entrance is located on The Terrace with a side entrance on Barnes High Street.

== History ==
The pub itself dates from at least the 17th century and the present building was constructed in 1846, the pub having been purchased in 1831 by what became Young's Brewery.

=== 1959–2012 ===
The Bull opened as a jazz venue in 1959 and, under the management of Albert Tolley, became an important venue for major UK and visiting international jazz musicians during the 1960s. The first gig was in November that year.

In 1982, Dan Fleming took over the premises and the venue continued to flourish with its jazz roster. Fleming added blues and rock acts to its listings, a policy which continues to this day.

The venue featured in Martin Scorsese's History of the Blues (2003).

The music room was refurbished with sponsorship from Yamaha in 2006 and was renamed "The Yamaha Room". In 2009 the Bull celebrated fifty years as a venue.

=== 2013: change of ownership ===
On 1 July 2013 Fleming retired and the Bull's Head lease was sold to Geronimo Inns, a wholly owned subsidiary of Young & Co. Although the new lease agreement was said to protect the continuation of live music, a petition to preserve the music room was launched in June 2013. The Yamaha Room became 'The Bolan Room' for pub dining and the Thai kitchen across the courtyard named 'The Stables' was closed and converted into 'The Jazz Room'. In much need of acoustic improvement, it was opened at the beginning of 2014.

== Musicians who have performed at the Bulls Head in Barnes ==
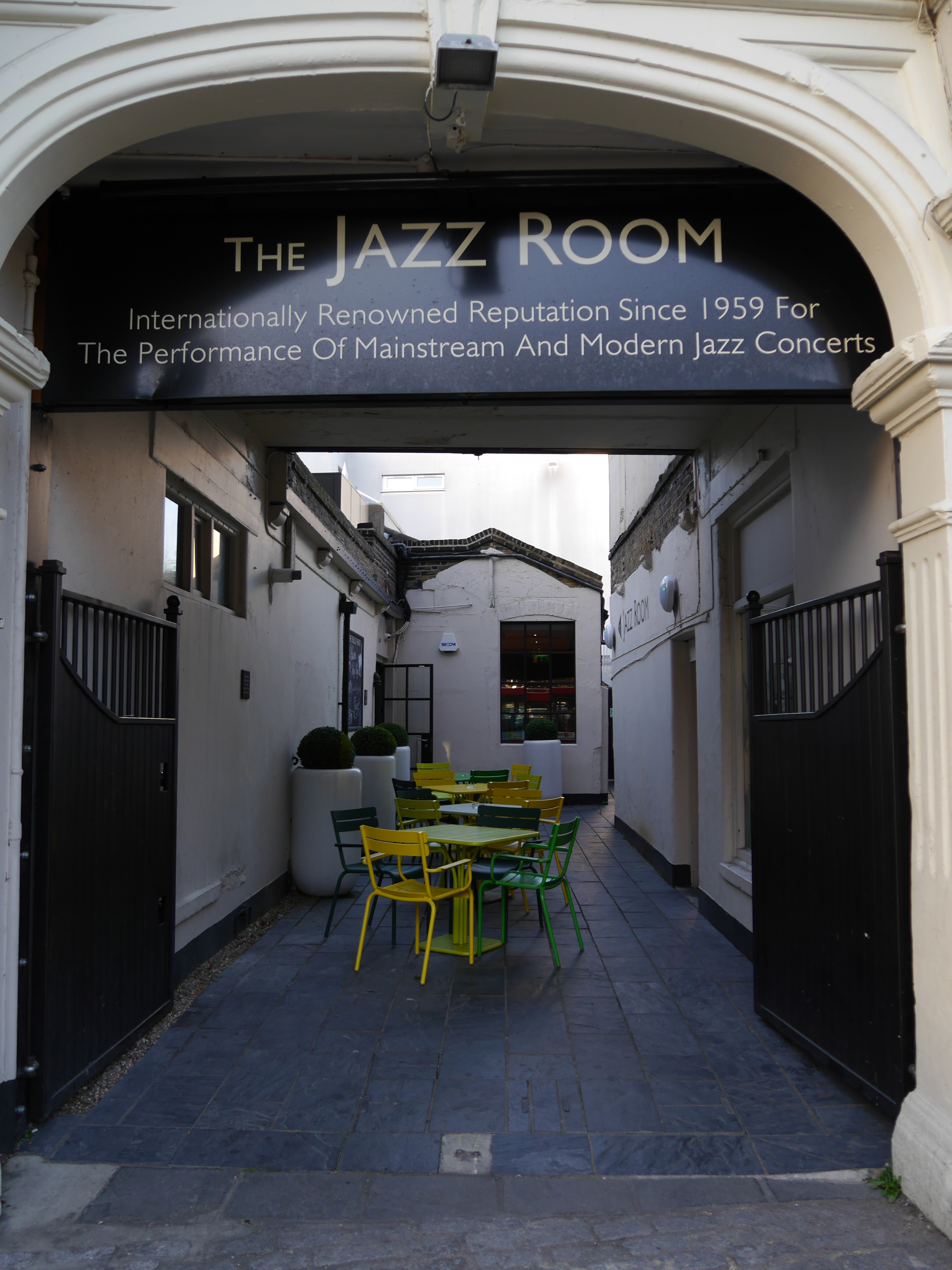
Bull's Head, 2014. Entrance on Barnes High Street.

Alphabetical listing

P. P. Arnold, Harry Allen, Vic Ash, Guy Barker, Jeff Beck, Mark Buckingham, Richard Busiakiewicz, Maggie Bell, Conte Candoli, Roger Chapman, Al Cohn, George Coleman, The Quentin Collins Quartet Jim Cregan, Jamie Cullum, Blossom Dearie, Digby Fairweather, Johnny Dankworth, Herb Geller, Papa George, Coleman Hawkins, Tubby Hayes, Frank Holder, Chris Jagger, Mick Jagger, Sheila Jordan, Peter King, Harold Land, Cleo Laine, Tony Lee, Bill Le Sage, Linda Lewis, Arthur Louis, Humphrey Lyttelton, who performed monthly at the Bull's Head for 42 years, Rik Mayall, Billy Mitchell, Zoot Money, Gary Moore, Lanny Morgan, Dick Morrissey, Never the Bride, John O'Leary & Alan Glenn Allstars, Gerard Presencer, Alan Price, Spike Robinson, Shorty Rogers, Charlie Rouse, Jim Mullen, Ronnie Scott, Sax Appeal, Phil Seamen, Bud Shank, Terry Smith, Harry South, Kathy Stobart, Stan Sulzmann, Bobby Tench, The Barnes Blues Band, Art Themen, Stan Tracey, Charlie Watts, Ben Webster, Don Weller, Bobby Wellins, Harvey Weston, Jimmy Witherspoon, Ronnie Wood.

== Live recordings ==
- Storm Warning! (Mercury) – The Dick Morrissey Quartet (Harry South, Phil Bates, Phil Seamen, Dick Morrissey). Bulls Head Music, 1966
- Spoon Sings and Swings – Jimmy Witherspoon. Bulls Head Music, 1966
- Now! ... Live! (Verve S/VLP9220) – Phil Seamen Trio (Phil Seaman, Tony Lee, Tony Archer). Bulls Head Music, 1968
- Live at the Bull – Tribute Vols. 1–2. Featuring Dick Morrissey, Spike Robinson, Bill Le Sage, Alec Dankworth, Bill Eyden (recorded 1987/8). Bulls Head Music. 2007
