= Stan Reynolds (musician) =

English jazz trumpeter

- Born: Stanley Brian Reynolds; 16 January 1926
- Died: 14 April 2018 (aged 92)
- Instrument: Trumpet

Stanley Brian Reynolds (16 January 1926 – 14 April 2018) was an English jazz trumpeter.

== Life and work ==
Reynolds began his musical career when he toured with the Tommy Sampson Orchestra at age 14. In 1948, he played with Ted Heath and His Music, and from the 1950s, he also worked with Vic Lewis, Dave Shepherd, Kenny Baker, Johnny Keating, Louie Bellson and Buddy Rich. As a session musician, he was involved as a soloist on the Beatles' White Album with a trumpet solo in "Martha My Dear". In 1975, under his own name the, he created his own big band album, The Greatest Swing Band in the World...is British (PYE). In the 1980s, he worked with Barbara Thompson and Chris Smith. In the field of jazz he was involved in 84 recording sessions between 1948 and 1989. He died on 14 April 2018 at age 92.
