= Eddie Blair (jazz musician) =

Scottish jazz trumpeter (1927–2020)

- Born: June 25, 1927; Johnstone, Renfrewshire, Scotland
- Died: December 26, 2020 (aged 93) Rustington, West Sussex, England
- Occupation: Jazz musician

Eddie Blair (25 June 1927 – 26 December 2020), full name Edward Dunning Blair, was a Scottish jazz trumpeter, a central figure among London-based session musicians in the 1960s and into the 1980s.

== Early career ==
Blair was born in Johnstone, Renfrewshire into a musical family and joined a brass band as a cornet player at the age of 10. In 1945 at the age of 18, he was called up for three years in the Royal Corps of Signals. He was never an army musician, but played trumpet in various service dance bands during this period. From 1948, while attending the Glasgow College of Technology by day, he began playing with local bandleaders such as Bert Tobias and George Scott Henderson at night. A date with the Ken Mackintosh band when they visited Glasgow helped him to win some wider recognition. In August 1951 his first big break came when he was called in to replace Jimmy Deuchar in the Johnny Dankworth Seven. At that time the band also included saxophonist Don Rendell, trombonist Eddie Harvey and pianist Bill Le Sage. After a year and a half Dankworth absorbed the Seven into his big band and Blair was then playing as one of several brass players.

== Ted Heath and jazz ==
He stayed with Dankworth until the Spring of 1954, when he joined the Ted Heath Band, then at the peak of its popularity. He was in the band for its 1956 tour of the US, the first such tour by a British band. Also in the trumpet section at this time were Bobby Pratt, Duncan Campbell and Bert Ezzard. Blair remained as a regular member of the Ted Heath Band until 1965.

From then on Blair began building on his jazz credentials and developing his soloing, appearing at live gigs and recordings with bands led by Johnny Keating, Dave Lee and Stan Tracey. He can be heard on the Johnny Keating British Jazz and Swinging Scots LPs, issued in 1956 and 1957. He is also present on the Tubby Hayes release Blues at the Manor, 1959-60. Blair worked with Ronnie Scott's septet in 1962 and with Ken Moule. Simon Spillett believes his solo on the track 'Portrait of a Queen' (on Stan Tracey's Alice in Jazz Land, 1966) "might well be Blair’s best on record". He never fronted his own band.

== Session work ==
Most of the pop session musicians active from the mid-1960s onwards had served their apprenticeships in the jazz world. Blair's sessions include much that is uncredited. Those that are known include sessions for Dave Clark (You Got What it Takes), Nat King Cole, Tom Jones, Johnny Mathis, Frank Sinatra, and the rock group Savoy Brown. Blair was a member of the house band on the Scottish Television Show The Jazz Series in the late 1970s. He played on the Benny Hill Show theme music. He played in a series of James Bond films, from Dr. No onwards into the 1980s - including the Flugelhorn solo on the track 'Take Me Home', from For Your Eyes Only (1981).

== Later life ==
Blair continued to perform and tour regularly into the 1980s - for instance he appeared at the Barbican with the John Dankworth Big Band in August 1988. He also performed in the West End production of Anything Goes in 1989, and turned out for occasional Ted Heath memorial concerts. He retired in 1992 and died, in Rustington, West Sussex, on Boxing Day 2020, aged 93.

== Selected discography ==
- Ted Heath and his Music: A Yank In Europe (The Music Of Raymond Scott) (1957)
- Tubby Hayes: Tubbs (1961)
- Peter Burman's Jazz Tête-à-Tête (the Ray Premru Group) (1962)
- Tubby Hayes: BBC Jazz for Moderns (recorded 1962, released 2009)
- Joe Harriott and John Mayer: Indo-Jazz Suite (1966)
- Dave Lee: Jazz Improvisations of Our Man Crichton (1965)
- Stan Tracey: Alice In Jazz Land (1966)
- Alan Branscombe: Swingin’ On The Sound Stage (1968)
- Johnnie Spence Big Band: Why Not (1968)
- Louis Bellson: Louie In London (1970)
- Les Brown and his Band of Renown: The One and Only (1985)
