= Ronnie Verrell =

English jazz drummer (1926–2002)

- Born: Ronald Thomas Verrell; 21 February 1926; Rochester, Kent, England
- Died: 22 February 2002 (aged 76) Kingston-upon-Thames, England
- Genres: Jazz, big band
- Occupation: Musician
- Instrument: Drums
- Years active: Mid-1940s–2001

Ronald Thomas Verrell (21 February 1926 – 22 February 2002) was an English jazz drummer. He played in two of the United Kingdom's "most famous" big bands, the Ted Heath Orchestra and the Syd Lawrence Orchestra. Verrell also worked extensively in television, including as a drummer in Jack Parnell's ATV Orchestra and Sunday Night at the London Palladium. He also provided the drumming for The Muppet Show's Animal, and was a "Skinnerette" on The Frank Skinner Show.

The Scotsman called Verrell a "driving band drummer" and an "exciting soloist". The Daily Telegraph said Verrell had a "rare combination of craftsmanship and bravura showmanship" and called him "Britain's best-known big band drummer for half a century".

== Biography ==
Ronnie Verrell was born on 21 February 1926 in Rochester, Kent in England. Initially he showed little interest in music until he saw the Benny Goodman Quartet perform in a film, Hollywood Hotel in 1938. Verrell was so impressed by what he saw, he stayed to watch the film a second time. He wanted to be a drummer and taught himself how to play after only one lesson. In 1940, after the outbreak of World War II, the 14-year-old Verrell was evacuated to Porthcawl in South Wales, where he made his first public appearances drumming with local bands in the area. He returned to Kent in 1943 and worked professionally for a while with the Claude Giddins band, before being conscripted to work as a Bevin Boy in the coal mines for the remainder of the war.

In the mid-1940s Verrell began performing with Scottish saxophonist Tommy Whittle and Belgian trumpeter Johnny Claes. Then between 1947 and 1951 he played with several big bands, including those led by Carl Barriteau and Cyril Stapleton. In September 1951 Verrell joined the Ted Heath Orchestra and remained with the band until Heath's retirement in 1964. At the time Heath's band was the leading British big band, and they performed at many concerts, including Sunday-night swing sessions at the London Palladium. They toured America in 1956 and were the first British big band to break into the US big band arena. Verrell played on many Heath hits, including "The Champ", "Hot Toddy" and "Swingin' Shepherd Blues". One of his best known drum solos with the orchestra was the "Hawaiian War Chant".

After leaving Heath's band Verrell focused on session work and backed many popular artists, including Jack Jones, Tony Bennett, Tom Jones, Shirley Bassey, Jonathan King, Petula Clark, Winifred Atwell, and Strawbs. Verrell also joined Jack Parnell's house band at ATV, playing with them for ten years. In 1980 Verrell joined Syd Lawrence's band and stayed with them for almost 20 years.

Verrell also performed in several television shows, including The Muppet Show where he played drums for the show's manic puppet drummer, Animal. When American drummer Buddy Rich, one of Verrell's heroes, guested on the show, Verrell (as Animal) had a drumming duel with Rich, and won after Animal smashed a snare drum over Rich's head.

In the mid-1990s, Verrell formed his own band, a quintet he modelled after Benny Goodman's band. Several years later Verrell was involved in a serious road accident that forced him to stop performing for almost a year. But after recovering he continued to play with Lawrence's band. In 2000 Verrell toured with an all-star band, Best of British, where his drum solos earned him standing ovations. His final appearance was on The Frank Skinner Show in 2001.

Verrell died on 22 February 2002 in Kingston-upon-Thames in England, one day after his 76th birthday. The cause of death was a chest infection he contracted during an operation to fix a crushed vertebra resulting from a fall down some stairs in November 2001. Verrell was married three times and had three daughters, Sherry, Faye, and Lara. He also has three grandchildren, Sherry's son David, Faye's daughter Bethany, and Lara's daughter Ellie-Jaye.
