= Billy Penrose =

English jazz musician

Billy Penrose (1925–1962, Brighton) was an English jazz musician who played piano, and trumpet. He formed his own quartet which played boogie-woogie music.

Billy played with a number of bands as well as forming his own quartet. It was while he was the pianist for the Lou Preager Orchestra that he formed his own quartet with Paul Rich (guitarist) and the bass player and drummer from the orchestra. They recorded six songs which were released on three records:

- Boogie In The Groove b/w Lazy Boogie recorded March 1945, released May 1945
- Boogie In Black And White b/w Billy's Boogie recorded June 1945, released September 1945
- Harlem Boogie b/w Boogie In The Ballroom recorded March 1945, released October 1946

He toured the Middle East for the Combined Services Entertainment with Betty Smith in 1947, during which they were fired upon by Arabs whilst in Palestine.

He joined the Harry Bence band and toured India 1957–8. However he contracted a tropical illness which ended his musical career. He returned to the UK and was for a while in Paddington General Hospital. He later moved to Sussex and died in hospital in Brighton in 1962.
