= Tony Archer (musician) =

- Born: Anthony John Archer; 14 July 1939; Dulwich, London, England
- Died: August 22, 2025 (aged 86) Biggin Hill, England
- Genres: Jazz
- Occupation: Musician
- Instrument: Double bass
- Years active: 1961–2025

Anthony John Archer (14 July 1939 – 22 August 2025) was an English jazz double-bassist.

Archer studied cello as a schoolboy before settling on upright bass. He joined Don Rendell's group in 1961, then with Roy Budd and Eddie Thompson before beginning work with Tony Lee, with whom he would collaborate for many years as part of Lee's trio, particularly at The Bull's Head public house and music venue in Barnes, South West London as well as Ronnie Scott's Jazz Club. He later played with Brian Lemon, Sandy Brown, Harold McNair, John Dankworth, and in the Best of British Jazz group with Kenny Baker and Don Lusher. Archer continued to work with Lee nearly until Lee's death in 2004.

Archer died on 22 August 2025, at the age of 86.

== Sources ==
- Nevil Skrimshire, "Tony Archer". The New Grove Dictionary of Jazz.
- Eugene Chadbourne, Tony Archer at Allmusic
