= The John Barry Seven =

English rock and roll band (1957–1965)

- Origin: York, England
- Genres: Rock and roll Pop
- Instrument: Various
- Years active: 1957–1965
- Labels: Parlophone; Columbia (EMI); Ember
- Website: John Barry Seven page

The John Barry Seven were an English rock and roll band formed by John Barry in 1957, after he abandoned his original career path of arranging for big bands.

== Origins ==
Barry contacted three musicians with whom he had served in the Army and three local musicians and invited them to join his new band. The first line-up was: Barry (vocals and trumpet), Mike Cox (tenor saxophone), Derek Myers (alto sax), Ken Golder (drums), Fred Kirk (bass guitar), Ken Richards (lead guitar) and Keith Kelly (rhythm guitar). For a short time, the John Barry Seven became John Barry & the Seven when he introduced a vibraphone player, John Aris, but by the time the band began recording for EMI (Parlophone) the experiment had been abandoned.

== Early years ==
The John Barry Seven (JB7) appeared on British TV shows such as Six-Five Special and Oh Boy! during 1957 and 1958, but discontent began spreading through the band. Jack Good proved to be a hard taskmaster on Oh Boy! Rehearsals were lengthy, intense and arduous to perfect what was a fast-paced show. When compounded by a tough touring schedule and regular recording commitments, morale began to suffer among the band's members. Some resentment towards Barry simmered to the boil, because he did not have to appear when accompanying other artists on the bill. Add the homesickness, caused by travelling, to the list of grievances plus irregular work, meant that the band had arrived back home in Yorkshire, by the time that the London-based Barry was in a position to call them south again for a few more dates. Moreover, they were losing a certain amount of work on Oh Boy! resulting in a substantial reduction in wages.

As a consequence, Derek Myers accepted an offer to play with a big band in Scotland. Mike Cox also left; likewise, Fred Kirk (a trained aircraft fitter), after spotting a job in aviation. When Ken Richards announced he wanted to return to Scarborough, Ken Golder felt it was time for him to go too.

== New line-up ==
Mike Peters and Jimmy Stead (both from Ossett, near Leeds) replaced Kirk and Myers respectively. Peters then introduced the Londoner Dennis King as a replacement for Cox, while Stead brought in Dougie Wright, a drummer with whom he had played in the Leeds-based Bill Marsden Big Band. It meant that with the exception of Barry and Keith Kelly, the original band line-up had disintegrated. Another Leeds lead guitarist, Jack Oliver, lasted a week, before Barry decided to approach Vic Flick, then working with The Bob Cort Skiffle Group. Flick arrived in time to rehearse for an important show at the Metropolitan in Edgware Road on 10 November 1958. The Seven was contracted to perform a 20-minute act as well as backing several other artists, including Marty Wilde. The line-up now read: John Barry (trumpet), Vic Flick (lead guitar), Mike Peters (bass guitar), Keith Kelly (rhythm guitar), Jimmy Stead (baritone sax), Dennis King (tenor sax) and Dougie Wright (drums). For a very short time they experimented with a female singer, Liza Page, the sister of the TV star Jill Day.

== Drumbeat ==
Drumbeat was created to fill a spot in the BBC's summer schedules, and was intended to threaten the popularity of ITV's Oh Boy! Producer Stewart Morris offered the band an audition with a view to appearing in its own right and also to back a variety of other artists, just as in the early days of Oh Boy! Barry introduced a pianist into the group as a replacement for Keith Kelly, who had decided to try a solo career. Vic Flick suggested his flatmate Les Reed, then playing jazz piano in London night clubs.

The new line-up lasted until 1961 when Barry became too busy arranging and composing to continue. He installed Vic Flick as the leader and brought in Bobby Carr on trumpet to take his place. The band enjoyed some success in the UK singles chart, as well as appearing regularly on radio and TV and on pop package tours – often with Adam Faith.

== Further changes ==
During 1962, Dougie Wright and Les Reed departed – the former in search of more regular work and the latter to forge a career in writing and producing. Dickie Harwood and then Andy White replaced Wright for a short period, while Brian 'Rachmaninoff' Hazelby initially took over from Les Reed, before Kenny Salmon also joined the ensemble. With Barry concentrating on his own future, the band was unable to find the same amount of work, particularly after having severed links with Adam Faith. After "The James Bond Theme" had peaked at No. 13 in the UK singles chart in late 1962, further chart success was proving elusive.

Vic Flick had been with the Seven since late 1958 and had led the band on stage for the past two years, but increasing demands on his time as a session player led to his decision to leave. Although he gave three months notice, Barry was unable to find a suitable replacement, thereby forcing him to temporarily disband the group. Flick's last performance as a member of the Seven was at Torquay in August 1963.

== Final changes ==
By October 1963, after a temporary hiatus, Barry was able to assemble the nucleus of a resurrected JB7 with the assistance of session drummer Bobby Graham. According to Graham, he had been requested by Barry to take over the leadership. Graham had been a member of the Outlaws, Joe Brown and the Bruvvers and Marty Wilde's Wildcats before moving into regular session work. At this point, the band consisted of Graham (drums), Ray Styles (bass guitar), Tony Ashton (keyboards), Ray Russell (lead guitar), Terry Childs (baritone sax), Bob Downes (tenor sax) and Alan Bown (trumpet). After only a few months, Dave Richmond was recruited to replace Styles on bass guitar, while Ron Edgeworth took over from Ashton on keyboards and vocals.

In 1964, Graham – like Flick and Richmond before him – decided to concentrate on ever-increasing studio session work. At that point, Alan Bown took over as leader of the JB7, leaving only him and Terry Childs remaining from the Graham-led band. As soon as he took charge of the JB7, he was keen to book the new line-up into a studio, the result of which was the single "24 Hours Ago", the first JB7 vocal since Barry's early efforts seven years previously. This recording featured new vocalist and keyboard player Mike O'Neil, and apart from Bown and Childs, the line-up was Dave Green (tenor sax), Stan Haldane (bass guitar), Ernie Cox (drums) and Ron Menicos (lead guitar). The one remaining significant change to the line-up involved Mike O'Neil, who was replaced on keyboards/vocals by Jeff Bannister. Bown admitted to having been disappointed when Barry gave him three months' notice of intent to permanently disband the group. Bown formed the Alan Bown Set, which included Stan Haldane, Jeff Bannister and Dave Green from the remains of the group.

== Hit singles ==
- "Hit and Miss" as The John Barry Seven plus Four, UK No. 10 (first charted March 1960) Used as the theme for Juke Box Jury.
- "Beat for Beatniks" as The John Barry Orchestra, UK No. 40 (April 1960)
- "Never Let Go" as The John Barry Orchestra, UK No. 49 (July 1960)
- "Blueberry Hill" as The John Barry Orchestra, UK No. 34 (August 1960)
- "Walk Don't Run" as The John Barry Seven, UK No. 11 (September 1960)
- "Black Stockings" as The John Barry Seven, UK No. 27 (December 1960)
- "The Magnificent Seven" as The John Barry Seven, UK No. 45 (March 1961)
- "Cutty Sark" as The John Barry Seven, UK No. 35 (April 1962)
- "The James Bond Theme" as The John Barry Orchestra, UK No. 13 (November 1962)
- "From Russia with Love" as The John Barry Orchestra, UK No. 39 (November 1963)

The four highest-charting hits all spent more than 10 weeks in the UK chart.
