= Vic Flick =

English guitarist (1937–2024)

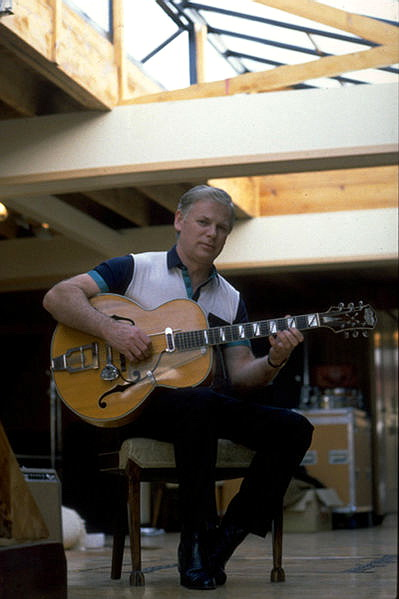
- Flick in 1989

Background information
- Born: Victor Harold Flick; 14 May 1937; Worcester Park, Surrey, England
- Died: 14 November 2024 (aged 87) Los Angeles, California, U.S.
- Genre: Film score
- Occupations: Guitarist; composer; conductor
- Instrument: Guitar
- Years active: 1957–2012
- Formerly of: Apollo 100; The John Barry Seven; George Martin Orchestra

Victor Harold Flick (14 May 1937 – 14 November 2024) was an English studio guitarist, prominent in the 1960s and known for playing the guitar riff in the "James Bond Theme".

== Early life ==
Flick was born in Worcester Park, Surrey, on 14 May 1937. Both of his parents were involved with music: his father taught piano and his mother sang. He began playing guitar when he was fourteen, and he joined his father's dance band.

== Career ==
By the mid 1950s, Flick worked regularly in bands at Butlin's holiday camps, where he was seen and recruited by bandleader Eric Winstone for his BBC radio shows. He also joined the Bob Cort Skiffle Group, who toured Britain with Paul Anka in 1957. He met John Barry, and joined the John Barry Seven, contributing guitar to the soundtrack of the 1960 film Beat Girl starring Adam Faith. The John Barry Seven had a hit with Flick's 1961 composition “Zapata”. His guitar work is prominent on "Hit and Miss", the theme song of the television show Juke Box Jury.

Flick left the John Barry Seven in 1963 and established himself as one of the leading session guitarists in London. On the Dr. No soundtrack, he was lead guitarist on the track "James Bond Theme". Flick continued to contribute to the James Bond soundtracks from the 1960s through the late 1980s. One of Flick's guitars, a Clifford Essex Paragon De Luxe, on which he played the original "James Bond Theme", was displayed at the Rock and Roll Hall of Fame in Cleveland, Ohio.

Flick worked with many recording artists, including Dusty Springfield, Nancy Sinatra, Cliff Richard, Shirley Bassey among countless others. He played his Vox 12 string guitar on Peter and Gordon's 1964 # 1 record "A World Without Love". He is heard on all of Tom Jones' early hits including "It's Not Unusual" and "What’s New Pussycat?", and is the guitarist for the number 1 song “Downtown” by Petula Clark. He recorded with Herman's Hermits, playing the distinctive guitar riff in the intro and bridge of "Silhouettes", a 1965 UK Top 5 hit. (Note: Although maintained by Flick, this was disputed by Karl Green of Herman’s Hermits in an interview on the Sky Arts programme “The British Invasion”.) With the George Martin Orchestra, he plays solo guitar, using his Olympic white 1961 Fender Stratocaster, on the song "Ringo's Theme (This Boy)" in the Beatles' 1964 film A Hard Day's Night, heard on the American soundtrack album. He was also the guitarist for Paul McCartney's Thrillington album.

Flick also collaborated with Merchant Ivory Productions as composer/music arranger for Autobiography of a Princess (1975), The Europeans (1979), Quartet (1981), and Heat and Dust (1983).

In 1999, Flick worked with composer Nic Raine, backed by the Prague Philharmonic Orchestra, on the James Bond tribute album titled Bond Back in Action. In 2003, he recorded the album James Bond Now, featuring tracks from James Bond movies and new compositions.

In 2005, he played on the soundtrack of the From Russia With Love video game by Electronic Arts.

On 5 October 2012, Vic Flick was honoured at the Academy of Motion Pictures Arts and Sciences for "The Music of Bond: The First 50 Years." He played the "James Bond Theme" to a live audience, on his 1939 Clifford Essex Paragon De Luxe “James Bond” Guitar. He also was interviewed on stage by Jon Burlingame, a writer on the subject of music for film and television. He was also presented with the "Lifetime Achievement Award" in 2013 by The National Guitar Museum for "contribution to the history of the guitar." He was the fourth recipient of the annual award.

== Personal life and death ==
In 1960, Flick married Judith Reavil; they had two children, one of whom predeceased them in 2000.

In 2008, his autobiography, Vic Flick Guitarman: From James Bond to the Beatles and Beyond, (Note: ISBN 978-1593933081) was published by Bearmanor Media.

Flick appeared on a 2013 episode of the History Channel show, Pawn Stars, titled "No Shirt, No Shoes, No Service". He brought in his 1961 Fender Stratocaster guitar to shop owner Rick Harrison, who, after consulting Jesse Amoroso, settled on a price of $55,000 for the guitar. In 2014, the guitar sold at auction for $25,000. This guitar is owned by a private collector in Melbourne, Australia.

Flick died of complications from Alzheimer's disease at a care facility in Los Angeles on 14 November 2024, at the age of 87.

== Musical credits ==
Through some of London's top recording studios in the 1960's and 1970's like Decca Studios, Vic Flick played on original recordings with many famous musical artists including:

- The Walker Brothers – The Sun Ain't Gonna Shine (Anymore)
- Englebert Humperdinck – Can't Take My Eyes Off You
- Burt Bacharach – Trains and Boats and Planes
- Dusty Springfield – I Only Want to Be with You
- Tom Jones – Green, Green Grass of Home
- Herman's Hermits – No Milk Today
- B. J. Thomas – Hooked on a Feeling
- Cliff Richard – Theme for a Dream
- Sandie Shaw – Puppet on a String
- Cilla Black – You're My World
- John Williams – Romanza

These song credits were researched in 2023 from Vic's own personal documentation, which is also briefly seen on the YouTube video of Vic Flick visiting Pawn Stars in 2013.

== Discography ==
- West of Windward – 1968 – Rediffusion
- Bond Back in Action (Featured/1999)
- James Bond Now (2003)
