= Keith Kelly (singer) =

- Born: Michael Pailthorpe; 1935 (age 90–91); Selby, West Riding of Yorkshire, England
- Genres: Pop
- Occupations: Singer, guitarist, songwriter
- Years active: Late 1950s–mid 1960s
- Label: Parlophone

Michael Pailthorpe (born 1935), (Note: Some sources cite 1937 as his year of birth) better known as Keith Kelly, is an English pop singer, guitarist and songwriter. An original member of The John Barry Seven, Kelly had two solo hits on the UK Singles Chart in 1960. Kelly was a competent musician, capable of playing both the guitar and chromatic harmonica. Donned in his spectacles, he also bore a passing resemblance to Buddy Holly.

== Life and career ==
He was born in Selby, West Riding of Yorkshire, England. In the mid-1950s, Kelly spent three years serving in the Royal Air Force. After leaving military service, in 1957 he became an original member, vocalist, and rhythm guitarist of The John Barry Seven. He left Barry's group in early 1959, and sang at The 2i's Coffee Bar in Soho, London, where he was noticed by the watching record producer George Martin. Martin signed Kelly to Parlophone and his first single release, "Tease Me (Must You Always)" reached number 27 on the UK Singles Chart in May 1960. Kelly wrote his own hit on a London Underground train travelling towards his flat in Shepherd's Bush, London.

His fledgling career was dealt a blow when a car accident delayed the release of his follow-up single. "Listen Little Girl" (written by Claus Ogerman and Vee Bond) was released in July 1960, but only reached number 47 in the same chart, and the momentum was lost. It was to prove to be his last chart entry. When Matt Monro recorded "Portrait of My Love", he did so in the afternoon after Kelly had the morning session recording in the same studio. Kelly's "With You" b/w "You'll Break My Heart", was issued by Parlophone in November 1960. Kelly composed the A-side while the flip was written by Doc Pomus and Mort Shuman. His public profile was at its height in 1960; he performed "I'll Take Romance" (written by Ben Oakland, Oscar Hammerstein II) on BBC Radio's Saturday Club, appeared in episode 1.71 of Juke Box Jury as a mystery guest, plus he undertook a nationwide tour, which included dates at the Town Hall in Bridgwater, Somerset, in Grantham, plus at the Liverpool Empire Theatre, the Theatre Royal, Nottingham, the Birmingham Hippodrome, and the New Theatre, Cardiff. In November 1960, Parlophone issued Saturday Club, a compilation album which included Kelly's recordings of "I'll Take Romance" and "To Be With You".

In June 1961, Parlophone released Kelly's single "Cold White and Beautiful" b/w "When You First Fall in Love". On 23 April 1962, Kelly performed at the California Ballroom, Dunstable. He momentarily re-appeared in July 1965, with the single, "Laurie (Strange Things Happen)" b/w "Save Your Love For Me" on CBS. Kelly later joined the Hull based band, the Keith Herd Rhythm Group.

The 2011 compilation album, 1960 British Hit Parade, Vol. 1: January To June, had two Kelly songs, including "Tease Me (Must You Always)".

== UK chart singles discography ==
Year	Title	Record label	UK Singles Chart
1960	"Tease Me (Must You Always)" b/w "Ooh La La"	Parlophone	No. 27
1960	"Listen Little Girl" b/w "Uh Huh"	Parlophone	No. 47
