= Kenny Salmon =

English keyboardist (1933–1994)

Kenny Salmon (17 July 1933 – 5 November 1994) was an English keyboard player who played piano, organ and MiniMoog on many hit records, films, radio and television shows in the 1960s and 1970s.

== Early life and education ==
Salmon was born in Hainault, Essex and learned piano as a child.

== Career ==
After playing with several dance bands, Salmon joined the Eric Delaney band in 1959. At this time he started playing the Lowrey organ. He later played with other bands including Bob Miller and the Millermen, the Oscar Rabin Band and The John Barry Seven. By this time Kenny Salmon had exchanged his Lowrey for a Hammond organ with a Leslie speaker, and played at a number of recording sessions. From about 1964 he did session work exclusively, mainly on organ but also on other keyboard instruments as required. He accompanied artists such as Tom Jones, Petula Clark, Engelbert Humperdinck and Shirley Bassey, Ken Woodman, Dusty Springfield and featured on albums by Spencer Davis and ‘Le London Allstars’, a group of session players including Jimmy Page and John McLaughlin on guitars. He was commissioned to record his own LP for Decca’s Ace of Clubs label: Big Beat Organ, released in 1966 and subsequently re-packaged as Sounds Organized. This contains standards played on lead organ and rhythm section, as well as his own composition, Moontide.

Salmon also played in TV orchestras in a variety of programmes including the Rolf Harris show, Lulu and, for a decade from 1965, was a member of Johnny Pearson’s Top of the Pops Orchestra, which accompanied performers of songs in the week’s charts. When London hosted the 1968 Eurovision Song Contest he was part of the backing orchestra, and also featured on the soundtrack of many films including some of the Carry On (film series) films, What's New Pussycat? and Casino Royale (1967 film).

From the early 1960s to the mid-1970s, Salmon performed live regularly with his own small groups on BBC Radio; first on the Light Programme and later Radio 2 in Roundabout, Night Ride and other programmes. The Kenny Salmon Seven are among the guest artists in the Beatles’ From Us to You special broadcast on Boxing Day 1963; later sessions featured the Kenny Salmon Trio, with Russ Stableford on bass and John Dean on drums. Salmon also played in many other groups for BBC sessions which were recorded to comply with their needle-time policy. He played on the theme and background music for a number of television series, including The Persuaders!, Department S and Sapphire and Steel.

Salmon toured Europe with Cliff Richard in 1976, and worked as musical associate on several ATV series in the late 1970s, including variety shows and a drama series, All the Fun of the Fair (1979), for which he wrote some original music.

From the early 1970s Kenny Salmon concentrated increasingly on writing and recording his own music, both at commercial recording studios and in his own home studio. Some of these recordings were included in collections of library music issued by Bosworth & Co and Themes International.

== Partial discography ==
- Hair is Beautiful - with Barney Kessell
- PURE PLEASURE 3- (Soundtrack on CD)
- Hammond Heroes: 60s R&B Organ Grooves Lyrics (Various artists)
- That's Nice - with Kenny Woodman. 1965, reissued 2002 as Town Talk.
- Kenny Salmon Big Beat Organ. 1966, Decca
- Let's Go Solo / Rock Beat / Drums & Percussion (Moog compositions) 1975 Bosworth & Co

== Other sources ==
- Flick, Vic (2008) Vic Flick, Guitarman. Bearmanor Media ISBN 1593933088
