= Betty Smith (musician) =

English jazz saxophonist and singer (1929–2011)

- Born: 6 July 1929; Sileby, Leicestershire, England
- Died: 21 January 2011 (aged 81) Kirby Muxloe, Leicester, England
- Occupations: Musician; singer
- Instruments: Saxophone; vocals
- Years active: 1940s–1985
- Spouse: Jack Peberdy

Betty Smith (6 July 1929 – 21 January 2011) was an English jazz saxophonist and singer. She began playing the saxophone at the age of nine and left school six years later to perform with the travelling all-female septet Archie's Juveniles. She performed in the Middle East in 1947 and flew to Germany the following year. Smith and her husband Jack Peberdy joined Freddy Randall's band in 1950 before leaving seven years later to form their own quintet. Her time with Randall saw her travel the United States with some success in the country's hit parade. Her newly formed quintet found regular work and Smith later performed with the Ted Heath Orchestra and alongside Kenny Baker. Her career ended in 1985 and did not recover sufficiently to resume performing.

== Early life and career ==
Smith was born on 6 July 1929 in Sileby, Leicestershire, and her parents were innkeepers; her father played the trombone in a brass band. She began studying the piano from the age of six and started to play the saxophone (purchased by her father Gerald) three years later. She took up piano once again as her arms were too short for the slide of the trombone, an instrument her father decided she would have a future if she played it when she was eight. Smith's talent was noticed by a local village resident who paid for her education fees to allow her to attend the private Stoneygate School in Leicester. She began to play jazz in her teenage years, and she performed in local clubs, leading to reprimands by her headmistress. Smith left school when she was 15, and at the prompting of her father, auditioned for the travelling all-female saxophone septet Archie's Juveniles. Following performances for troops in the Middle East in 1947 with the pianist Billy Penrose, which saw her tour bus attacked, she toured with an all-female band led by Rudy Starita and flew to Germany to perform for officials taking time off from the Nuremberg trials.

Smith later joined the Ivy Benson Orchestra in 1948 and flew into Berlin to perform for troops when the city's blockade started. She married the trumpeter Jack Peberdy in August 1950 (after being introduced to him by her father at the saxophonist's 19th birthday party). Smith accepted an offer to join Freddy Randall's band the same year, and she and her husband worked full-time for the trumpeter from 1953 to February 1957. In mid-1956, the band travelled to the United States, in exchange for the visit of Louis Armstrong to the United Kingdom. She became the first English female jazz player to perform in the United States. Racial tensions were high in the era and in one theatre in Greenville, North Carolina where she was performing the band was evacuated because of a bomb. Smith toured with the same programme as Bill Haley & His Comets, and found some success when her recording of "Bewitched, Bothered and Bewildered" reached the American hit parade, garnering admiration with some of the country's famous musicians. Smith was voted one of Britain's best tenor-saxophone players in a 1957 Melody Maker poll.

That same year, Randall became ill and disbanded the group, leading Smith and Peberdy to decide to form their own quintet which included the pianist Brian Lemon. With Smith leading, the couple toured as support acts for the comedian Tony Hancock; Smith enlivened Hancock by performing "Abide with Me" out of tune. She found work into the summer seasons with visits to Guernsey and Cliftonville, and the band were residents on the SS Franconia. The band toured Australia and New Zealand, performed in the United States, made regular broadcasts on leading television and radio programmes, and she had her own programme on Radio Luxembourg. The band recorded three titles with the record company Decca and their fourth recording There's A Blue Ridge Round My Heart Virginia was successful. The quintet was disbanded in 1964. Smith played and sang with the Ted Heath Orchestra, and at this period of time, was now appearing in clubs and festivals in a solo capacity in Europe.

Her high quality performances led her to working with the trumpet virtuoso Kenny Baker and the two worked alongside each other for the rest of her career. A sextet called "The Best of British Jazz" was formed in the 1970s when two former Ted Heath musicians, trombonist Don Lusher and drummer Jack Parnell joined her and Baker. The band recorded two albums, including Exactly Like You in 1981.

== Final years ==
Smith appeared with Eggy Ley's Hotshots in the 1980s and was seen performing at several jazz festivals. The band ceased playing in 1985 when Smith became ill and Peberdy cared for her with the couple returning to Sileby in 1988. Smith had not recovered sufficiently when Baker reformed the band in 1992 but continued to play the piano the week before her death on 21 January 2011 at Baron Court's Nursing Home in Kirby Muxloe, Leicester. Peberdy survived her. Smith's funeral was held on 4 February at Loughborough Crematorium.

== Discography ==
- Double Shuffle (1957)
- Bewitched/Hand Jive (1958)
- My Foolish Heart (1958)
