= Tommy Whittle =

British jazz saxophonist (1926–2013)

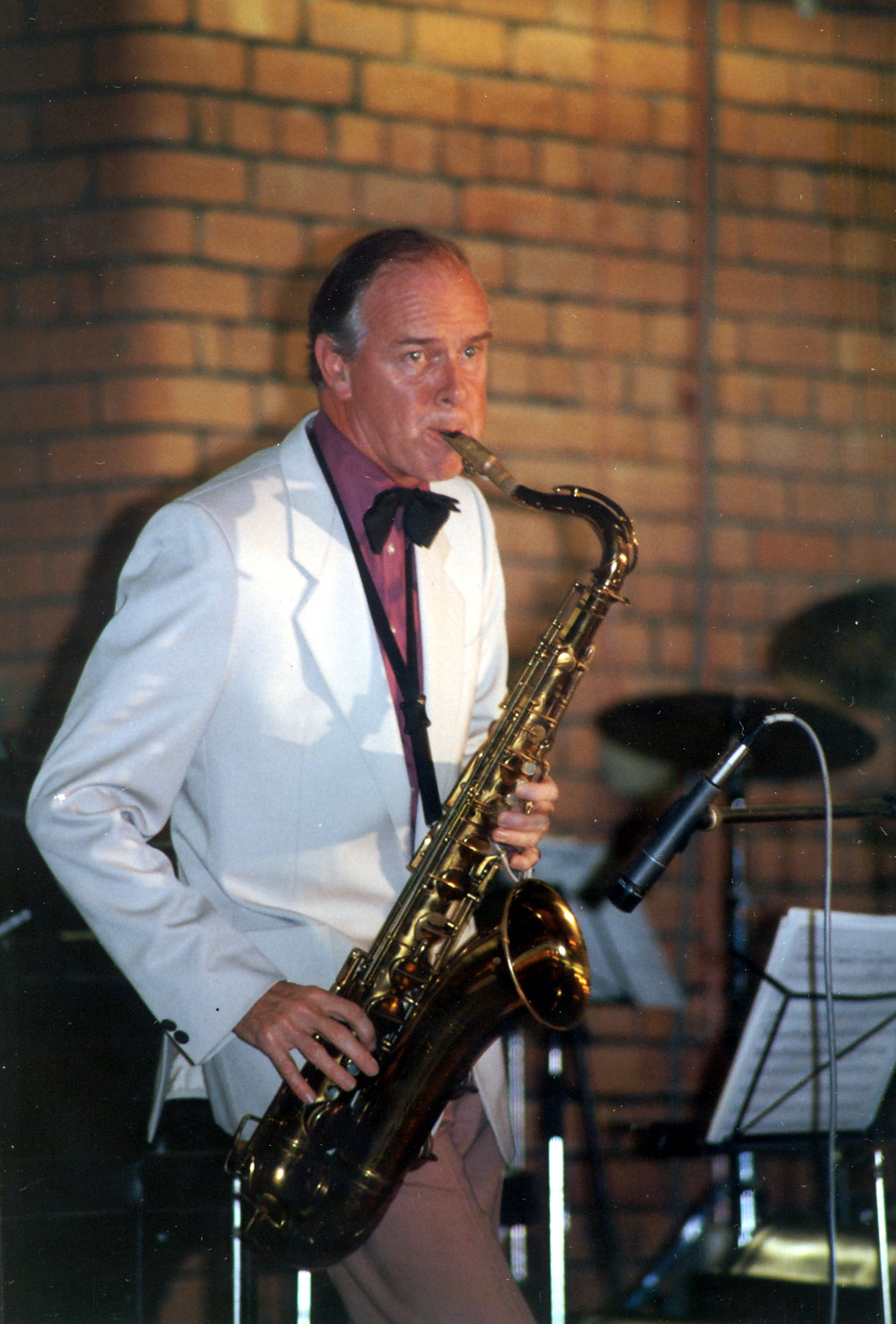
- Tommy Whittle playing at a jazz club circa 1990

Background information
- Born: Thomas Whittle; 13 October 1926; Grangemouth, Scotland
- Died: 13 October 2013 (aged 87) Spain
- Genres: Jazz
- Occupation: Musician
- Instrument: Saxophone

Thomas Whittle (13 October 1926 – 13 October 2013) was a British jazz saxophonist.

== Biography ==
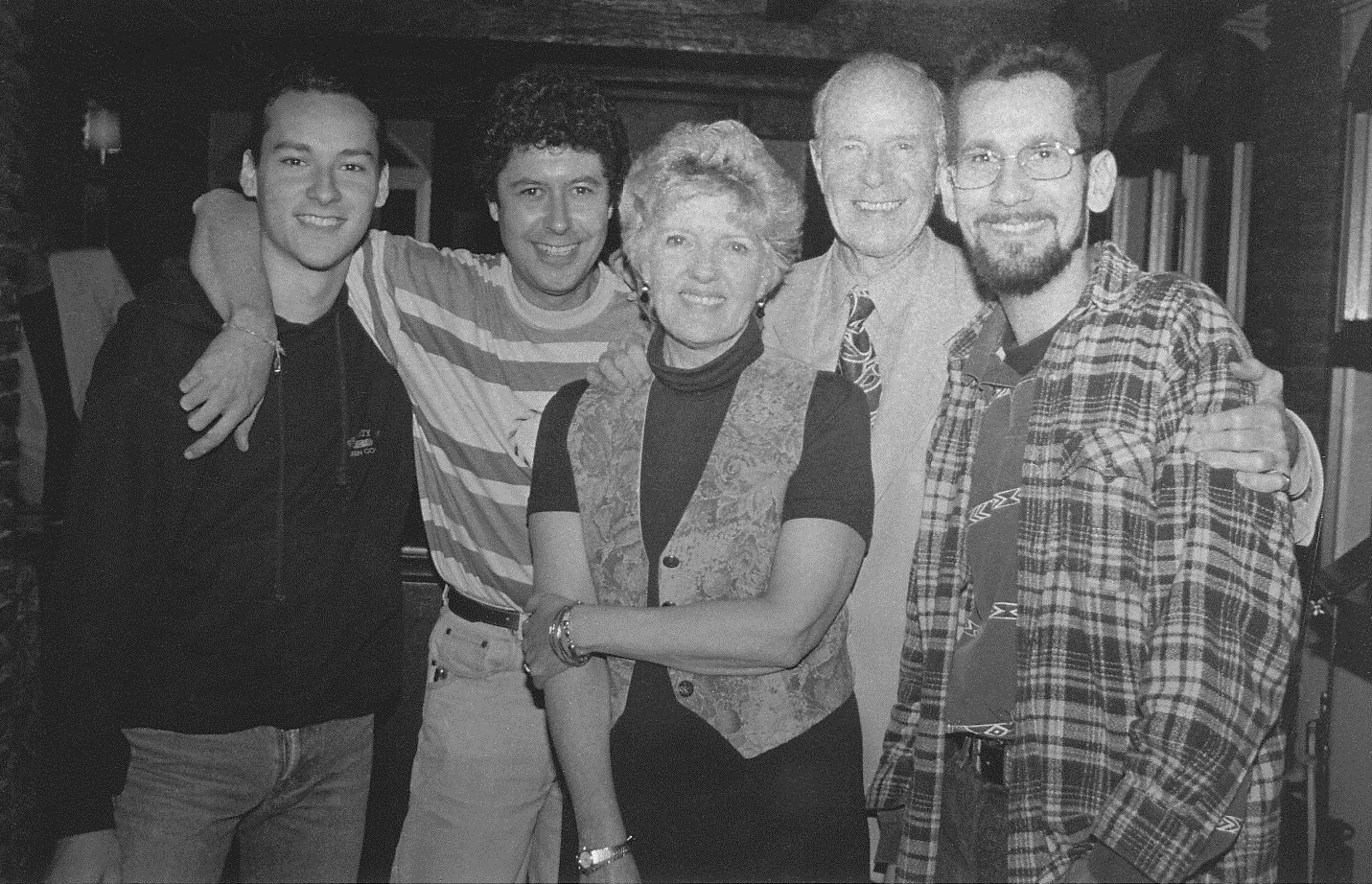
Tommy Whittle (second from right) after a concert at the Magnum's Jazz Club in Málaga (Spain) with his band in 1998

Tommy Whittle was born in Grangemouth, Scotland. He started playing clarinet at the age of 12 before taking up tenor saxophone at 13, guided by Alan Davie. He moved to Chatham, Kent, at 16 and in 1943 started playing in the dance-hall band of Claude Giddins in nearby Gillingham.

During the 1940s, Whittle played with Johnny Claes, Lew Stone, Carl Barriteau, and Harry Hayes. In 1946 he joined Ted Heath's band, playing with him until 1952 when he moved on to play in Tony Kinsey's small group at the 51 Club in London. Later in the 1950s he joined Cyril Stapleton's BBC Show Band where he became featured as a soloist in nationwide broadcasts. In April 1954 he formed his a quintet with Harry Klein and Dill Jones, later touring with a ten-piece band for 14 months. He then led small groups and performed in clubs. In 1955 he was voted Britain's top tenor-sax player in the New Musical Express poll and topped the Melody Maker poll the following year.

During the 1950s his sextet visited France and the United States. In 1956 he took a quartet (with Eddie Thompson, Brian Brocklehurst and Jackie Dougan) to the US in exchange for a visit by Gerry Mulligan. He also briefly deputized in the Stan Kenton Band, which was touring the UK. In 1958 he was hired as bandleader at the Dorchester Hotel in London, where he stayed until early 1961.

Then followed a period of 12 years with the Jack Parnell ATV Orchestra, which accompanied Bing Crosby, Peggy Lee, and Barbra Streisand.

He ran a weekly club at the Hopbine pub in Wembley, which became a showcase for British jazz, an appearance there being a mark of distinction. Later he worked with Laurie Johnson's London Big Band and recorded with Benny Goodman. During the 1980s and 1990s, he was in demand as a session musician and appeared in the Ted Heath Band led by trombonist Don Lusher. Through the 1990s and 2000s he continued to lead his quartet and accompanied the Ella Fitzgerald Songbook, a show devised by singer Barbara Jay (his wife). Also during this period he became a member and then leader of the Pizza Express All Stars Jazz Band.

In July 2005, Whittle was given the Worshipful Company of Musicians award for lifetime achievement in British jazz. His last performances included the Bridgewater Hall in Manchester (October 2012) and Ray McVay's tribute Glenn Miller Orchestra at the Wolverhampton Grand Theatre (January 2013). Whittle died on his 87th birthday after contracting pneumonia while on holiday in Spain.

== Discography ==
=== As leader ===
- Tommy Whittle Quartet (Melodisc, 1951)
- Tommy Whittle Septet (Melodisc, 1951)
- Tommy Whittle with the Tony Kinsey Trio (Esquire, 1953)
- Tommy Whittle Quintet (Esquire, 1954)
- Tommy Whittle Quintet (Esquire, 1955)
- Tommy Whittle Orchestra (Esquire, 1956)
- Tommy Whittle Quartet (HMV, 1957)
- A Touch of Latin (Saga, 1958)
- Tommy Whittle Quintet (Tempo and Ember, 1959)
- Sax for Dreamers (Masquerade, 1967)
- Tommy Whittle Quartet (HMV, 1957)
- Why Not? (Jam, 1977)
- Jigsaw (Alamo, 1977)
- The Nearness of You (Tee-Jay, 1982)
- Straight Eight with Alan Barnes (Miles Music, 1985)
- The Pizza Express All Star Band (The Poll Winners, 1990)
- Warm Glow (TeeJay, 1992)
- Encore! with the Bob Hudson Trio (Sine, 1997)
- Grace Notes (Spotlight, 2003)
- Tommy Whittle and the Tenor Connection (Spotlight, 2009)

=== As sideman ===
- Live at the Hopbine, Tubby Hayes (1965)
- Memories of You, Barbara Jay (Tee-Jay, 1988)
- Bean: Bob Wilber's Tribute to Coleman Hawkins, Bob Wilber (Arbors, 1995)
- The Don Lusher Big Band Vol. 2, Don Lusher (Horatio Nelson)
- Laurie Johnson's London Big Band Vol. 3, Laurie Johnson (Horatio Nelson, 2000)
- Ella Fitzgerald Songbook Revisited, Barbara Jay, Tina May, Lee Gibson (Spotlite, 2000)
- The Farewell Concert, Ted Heath (Avid, 2002)
- The Musical Worlds of Laurie Johnson, Laurie Johnson (Avid, 2003)
