= Jack Parnell =

English musician and musical director (1923–2010)

- Born: John Russell Parnell; 6 August 1923; London
- Died: 8 August 2010 (aged 87) Southwold, Suffolk, England
- Genre: Jazz
- Occupations: Musician; Bandleader
- Instrument: Drums
- Years active: 1944-2010

John Russell Parnell (6 August 1923 – 8 August 2010) was an English musician and musical director.

== Biography ==
Parnell was born into a theatrical family in London, England. His uncle was the theatrical impresario Val Parnell.

During his military service in the 1940s he became a member of Buddy Featherstonhaugh’s Radio Rhythm Club Sextet and played drums with Vic Lewis and other servicemen who were keen on jazz. From 1944 to 1946 Parnell recorded with Lewis, and the Lewis-Parnell Jazzmen’s version of "Ugly Child". During the 1940s and 1950s, he was voted best drummer in the Melody Maker poll for seven years in succession.

He was appointed as the musical director for ATV in 1956, a post he held until 1981, and was the "real" conductor for The Muppet Show orchestra for the series entire run and composed the score theme to ITC Entertainment. Throughout the 1960s, Parnell directed the pit orchestra for Sunday Night at the London Palladium. He composed many television themes, including Love Story (for which he won the Harriet Cohen Award), Father Brown, The Golden Shot and Family Fortunes. He was a regular judge on the ATV talent show New Faces. He was also the musical director for ATV's version of The Benny Hill Show.

In the 1970s, he had co-founded the group The Best of British Jazz with Kenny Baker, Don Lusher, Betty Smith, Tony Lee, and Tony Archer, which performed until 1985.

From 1991 until he died, Parnell was part of the Norfolk-based Mike Capocci Trio, with Capocci on piano and Mike Harris on the double bass. They backed saxophonists Johnny Griffin, Ronnie Ross, and Kathy Stobart. In 1994, he took over as the leader of the London Big Band, which comprised some of Britain's leading jazz musicians.

== Personal life and death ==
Parnell had three sons and two daughters (including Ric Parnell, who played the drummer Mick Shrimpton in the film This Is Spinal Tap). Parnell died in Southwold, Suffolk, from the effects of cancer on 8 August 2010, two days after his 87th birthday.
