= Don Lusher =

English jazz and big band trombonist (1923–2006)

Don Lusher OBE
- Born: Gordon Douglas Lusher; 6 November 1923; Peterborough, England
- Died: 5 July 2006 (aged 82) Cheam, England
- Genres: Jazz
- Occupations: Musician; Bandleader
- Instrument: Trombone
- Years active: 1945–2006

Gordon Douglas "Don" Lusher (6 November 1923 – 5 July 2006) was an English jazz and big band trombonist best known for his association with the Ted Heath Big Band. In a career spanning more than 60 years, he played trombone with a number of jazz orchestras and bands and was twice president of the British Trombone Society.

== Early life and career ==
Lusher was born in Peterborough, England, and started playing the trombone aged six years old in his local Salvation Army band, the third generation of his family to do so. During World War II, he served as a gunner signaller in the Royal Artillery.

After the war, he became a professional musician, playing with the bands of Joe Daniels (his first professional job on £12-a-week), Lou Preager, Maurice Winnick, the Squadronaires, Jack Parnell and, lastly, the Ted Heath Big Band.

Lusher spent nine years as lead trombone with Ted Heath's Orchestra and toured the United States with him on five occasions. Ted Heath died in 1969. After several attempts to revive the band, Don took over the leadership in 1976 at the request of Ted Heath's widow, Moira. He led the 'Ted Heath Tribute Orchestra' throughout the 1980s and 1990s until its sold-out final concert at the Royal Festival Hall in December 2000. He also led the trombone section during many of Frank Sinatra's European tours. In 1975 he gave the first performance of Gordon Langford's Rhapsody for Trombone at London's Royal Albert Hall, and went on to perform it around the world. He also premiered works by Gareth Woods (Dance Sequence) and Gordon Carr's Concerto for Trombone.

== Later years ==
Lusher formed his own ensemble, the Don Lusher Big Band. He also performed with the Manhattan Sound Big Band, with Alexis Korner and various session musicians in the big band-rock fusion group CCS, and was a founder member of the Best of British Jazz group from the 1970s onwards.

He spent some years as a professor of the Royal College of Music before becoming professor of trombone at the Royal Marines School of Music, Portsmouth in 1997, a post he retired from in 2004.

In 2001, he recorded an album on the Decca label featuring Kenny Ball, Acker Bilk, John Chilton and the Feetwarmers, John Dankworth, Humphrey Lyttelton, and George Melly. It was entitled British Jazz Legends Together.

In 1993 he was awarded the status of Freeman of the City of London, and in 2002 Lusher received an OBE for services to the music industry. The Don Lusher Big Band played its final concert in 2007.

== Personal life and death ==
Don Lusher's first marriage was to Eileen Orchard, a singer with Lou Preager's danceband. Lusher married his second wife, Diana, after Eileen's death. He died in Cheam in 2006, aged 82, survived by his two sons from his first marriage and a stepson from his second.
