= Forgotten Roads: The Best of If =

Compilation album by If
- Released: 1995
- Recorded: 1970–1971
- Genres: Jazz rock; progressive rock
- Length: 65:45
- Label: Sequel Records
- Producers: Tracks 2, 5, 6, 7, 9 by Jon Child; Tracks 1 & 8 by If; Tracks 3, 4, 10, 11 by Lew Futterman

If chronology
Tea Break Over, Back on Your 'Eads (1975)	Forgotten Roads: The Best of If (1995)	Europe '72 (Live) (1997)

Forgotten Roads: The Best of If was British jazz-rock group If's first compilation album, released on CD twenty years after the band's dissolution in 1975. The tracks and line-up were from the first three If albums. It was followed two years later by a collection of live recordings from tours in Europe.

== Track listing ==
1. "Here Comes Mr Time" (John Mealing, Trevor Preston)
2. "Fibonacci's Number" (Dave Quincy)
3. "Sunday Sad" (Dick Morrissey)
4. "What Did I Say about the Box, Jack?" (Morrissey)
5. "Forgotten Roads" (Quincy, Preston)
6. "Seldom Seen Sam" (Terry Smith, J.W. Hodkinson)
7. "Child of Storm" (Quincy, Hodkinson)
8. "Sweet January" (Quincy, Preston)
9. "Upstairs" (Morrissey, Brigitta Morrissey)
10. "I'm Reaching out on All Sides" (Quincy, Fishman)
11. "What Can a Friend Say?" (Quincy)

== Personnel ==
- Dennis Elliott – drums
- J.W. Hodkinson – lead vocals and percussion
- John Mealing – keyboards and backing vocals
- Dick Morrissey – tenor/soprano saxophones and flute
- Dave Quincy – tenor/alto saxophones
- Jim Richardson – bass
- Terry Smith – guitar
