= Europe '72 (Live) =

Live album by If
- Released: 1997
- Recorded: 1972
- Genre: Jazz rock; progressive rock
- Length: 57:42
- Label: Repertoire Records

If chronology
Forgotten Roads: The Best of If (1995)	Europe '72 (Live) (1997)

Professional ratings
Review scores
Source	Rating
AllMusic	4/5 stars

Europe '72 (Live), released in 1997, is a compilation album of live performances by British jazz-rock group If. It features material from their first four LPs that was recorded live on tour and before studio audiences. The extensive liner notes, giving an exhaustive background on the band, were written by UK music critic Chris Welch.

== Track listing ==
1. "Waterfall" – 4:40
2. "The Light Still Shines" – 5:00
3. "Sector 17" – 8:06
4. "Throw Myself to the Wind" – 4:01
5. "I Couldn't Write and Tell You" – 9:45
6. "Your City Is Falling" – 5:47
7. "What Did I Say About the Box, Jack?" – 20:20

== Personnel ==
- Dennis Elliott – drums
- JW Hodkinson – lead vocals and percussion
- John Mealing – keyboards and backing vocals
- Dick Morrissey – tenor/soprano saxophones and flute
- Dave Quincy – tenor/alto saxophones
- Jim Richardson – bass
- Terry Smith – guitar
