= Georgie Fame discography =

- Studio albums: 34
- EPs: 10
- Live albums: 14
- Compilation albums: 18
- Singles: 50

This article is the discography of English R&B and jazz musician Georgie Fame, both with the Blue Flames and as a solo artist.

== Albums ==
=== Studio albums ===
Year	Title	Details	Peak chart positions				
Year	Title	Details	UK	NL	NOR	SWE	US
1964	Fame at Last!	Released: October 1964; Label: Columbia; With the Blue Flames; UK and Canada-only release (Note: Released in Canada by Capitol in May 1965 with the addition of "Yeh, Yeh".)	15	—	—	—	—
1965	Yeh Yeh	Released: April 1965; Label: Imperial; With the Blue Flames; US-only release	—	—	—	—	137
1966	Get Away	Released: March 1966; Label: Imperial; With the Blue Flames; US and Canada-only release	—	—	—	—	—
1966	Sweet Things	Released: May 1966; Label: Columbia; With the Blue Flames; UK-only release	6	—	—	—	—
1966	Sound Venture	Released: October 1966; Label: Columbia; With the Harry South Big Band	9	—	—	—	—
1967	The Two Faces of Fame	Released: July 1967; Label: CBS; Live first half with the Harry South Big Band; studio second half with the Georgie Fame Band	22	—	—	—	—
1968	The Third Face of Fame	Released: May 1968; Label: CBS; Released in the US by Epic in April 1968 as The Ballad of Bonnie and Clyde	—	—	—	—	185
1969	Georgie Does His Thing with Strings	Released: December 1969; Label: CBS; With the Keith Mansfield Orchestra	—	—	—	—	—
1970	Seventh Son	Released: January 1970; Label: CBS	—	—	—	—	—
1971	Going Home	Released: May 1971; Label: CBS; UK-only release	—	—	—	—	—
1971	Fame & Price / Price & Fame / Together	Released: 1971; Label: CBS; With Alan Price	—	—	—	—	—
1972	All Me Own Work	Released: 1972; Label: Reprise	—	—	—	—	—
1974	Georgie Fame	Released: October 1974; Label: Island	—	—	—	—	—
1979	Right Now!	Released: March 1979; Label: Pye	—	—	—	—	—
1979	That's What Friends Are For	Released: 1979; Label: Pye	—	—	—	—	—
1980	Closing the Gap	Released: 1980; Label: Piccadilly	—	—	—	—	—
1981	In Hoagland 1981	Released: June 1981; Label: Bald Eagle; With Annie Ross and Hoagy Carmichael	—	—	—	15	—
1983	In Goodmansland	Released: 1983; Label: Sonet; With Sylvia Vrethammar	—	—	—	—	—
1986	Georgie, Lena, Lasse	Released: July 1986; Label: Four Leaf Clover; With Lena Ericsson and Lasse Samuelson; Sweden-only release	—	—	—	—	—
1988	No Worries	Released: 1988; Label: Four Leaf Clover, CBS; Sweden and Australia-only release; Re-recordings with the uncredited Aussie Blue Flames	—	—	—	—	—
1989	A Portrait of Chet	Released: 1989; Label: Four Leaf Clover; Sweden-only release	—	—	—	—	—
1991	Cool Cat Blues	Released: May 1991; Label: Go Jazz, Blue Moon	—	—	—	—	—
1992	The Blues and Me	Released: June 1992; Label: Go Jazz	—	—	—	—	—
1992	City Life	Released: 1992; Label: BBC Radio 2; With Madeline Bell and the BBC Big Band	—	—	—	—	—
1994	Three Line Whip	Released: May 1994; Label: Three Line Whip	—	—	—	—	—
1995	How Long Has This Been Going On	Released: 4 December 1995; Label: Verve; Credited as Van Morrison with Georgie Fame & Friends; Recorded live without an audience	76	81	—	47	55
1996	Tell Me Something: The Songs of Mose Allison	Released: 8 October 1996; Label: Verve; Tribute album; With Van Morrison, Mose Allison and Ben Sidran	—	—	—	—	— (Note: Tell Me Something: The Songs of Mose Allison peaked at number 7 on the Billboard Jazz Albums chart and at number 1 on the Traditional Jazz Albums chart.)
2000	Poet in New York	Released: August 2000; Label: Go Jazz	—	—	—	—	—
2001	Relationships	Released: September 2001; Label: Three Line Whip	—	—	—	—	—
2003	Charlestons	Released: 20 October 2003; Label: Three Line Whip	—	—	—	—	—
2008	Jazz My Way	Released: 17 November 2008; Label: Curling Legs; Credited as Grethe Kausland featuring Georgie Fame; Original recordings from the 1970s and 1980s; Norway-only release	—	—	30	—	—
2009	Tone-Wheels 'A' Turnin'	Released: 15 June 2009; Label: Three Line Whip; With the Last Blue Flames	—	—	—	—	—
2012	Lost in a Lover's Dream	Released: 8 October 2012; Label: Three Line Whip	—	—	—	—	—
2015	Swan Songs	Released: 6 November 2015; Label: Three Line Whip; With the Last Blue Flames	—	—	—	—	—
"—" denotes releases that did not chart or were not released in that territory

=== Live albums ===
Year	Title	Details
1964	Rhythm and Blues at the Flamingo	Released: January 1964; Label: Columbia; With the Blue Flames
1970	Shorty Featuring Georgie Fame	Released: 1970; Label: Epic; Credited as Shorty Featuring Georgie Fame; US, Canada and Germany-only release
1983	Live at Montreux Jazzfestival	Released: 1983; Label: Dragon; With Hudik Big Band and Bengt-Arne Wallin; Sweden-only release
1991	Georgie on My Mind	Released: 1991; Label: Jazette; Croatia-only release
1992	Live in Japan	Released: 1992; Label: Go Jazz; With Ben Sidran, Bob Malach and Ricky Peterson; Germany-only release
1993	Endangered Species	Released: April 1993; Label: Music Mecca; With the Danish Radio Big Band; Denmark-only release
1997	Name Droppin': Live at Ronnie Scott's	Released: 1997; Label: Go Jazz
1998	Walking Wounded: Live at Ronnie Scott's	Released: October 1998; Label: Go Jazz
1999	Ring Tenth Anniversary	Released: 1999; Label: Jazette; With Ring All Stars; Croatia-only release
2004	Georgie Fame & the Birthday Big Band	Released: 27 September 2004; Label: Three Line Whip
2008	Live at the Royal Garden Jazz Club	Released: 2008; Label: Royal Garden Jazz Club; With the Boško Petrović Trio; Austria-only release
2014	Singer: The Musical; Steve Gray and Georgie Fame	Released: 6 April 2014; Label: Proper; Featuring Madeline Bell
2014	Rhythm and Blues at the Ricky Tick	Released: 14 April 2014; Label: Rhythm & Blues; Limited vinyl-only release
2015	A Declaration of Love	Released: 9 July 2015; Label: ITM Archives; With Uschi Brüning and the Alan Skidmore Quartet; Germany-only release

=== Compilation albums ===
Year	Title	Details	Peak chart positions
Year	Title	Details	UK
1967	Hall of Fame	Released: March 1967; Label: Columbia	12
1972	Fame Again!	Released: 1972; Label: Starline	—
1980	20 Beat Classics	Released: 1980; Label: RSO	—
1989	The First Thirty Years	Released: 20 November 1989; Label: Connoisseur Collection	—
1993	Get Away with Georgie Fame	Released: May 1993; Label: Spectrum Music	—
1995	Georgie Fame at His Best	Released: 1995; Label: Castle Communications	—
1996	The Best of Georgie Fame 1967–1971	Released: August 1996; Label: Columbia	—
1997	The Very Best of Georgie Fame and the Blue Flames	Released: 1997; Label: Spectrum Music	—
1999	Master Series	Released: 1999; Label: Polydor; With the Blue Flames	—
2001	Funny How Time Slips Away: The Pye Anthology	Released: 27 August 2001; Label: Sanctuary/Castle Music	—
2004	A Complete Hit Collection 1964–1971	Released: 13 July 2004; Label: Raven; Australia-only release	—
2004	Superhits	Released: 26 July 2004; Label: Columbia; With Alan Price	—
2007	Somebody Stole My Thunder: Jazz-Soul Grooves 1967–1971	Released: July 2007; Label: Sony BMG	—
2010	Mod Classics: 1964–1966	Released: February 2010; Label: BGP	—
2015	Yeh Yeh: The Georgie Fame Collection	Released: 22 May 2015; Label: Spectrum Music	—
2015	The Whole World’s Shaking: Complete Recordings 1963–1966	Released: 9 October 2015; Label: Polydor; 5-CD box set	—
2016	Survival: A Career Anthology 1963–2015	Released: 25 November 2016; Label: UMC; 6-CD box set	—
2019	South Venture	Released: 5 April 2019; Label: 1960s; With the Harry South Band and Lulu	—
"—" denotes releases that did not chart or were not released in that territory

== EPs ==
Year	Title (Note: This is a list of EPs released in the UK. Various other EPs were released elsewhere.)	Details	Peak chart positions
Year	Title	Details	UK
1964	Rhythm and Blue-Beat	Released: May 1964; Label: Columbia; With the Blue Flames	—
1964	Rhythm and Blues at the Flamingo	Released: December 1964; Label: Columbia	8
1965	Fame at Last	Released: February 1965; Label: Columbia; With the Blue Flames	—
1965	Fats for Fame	Released: May 1965; Label: Columbia; With the Blue Flames	15
1965	Move It On Over	Released: November 1965; Label: Columbia; With the Blue Flames	—
1966	Getaway	Released: December 1966; Label: Columbia	7
1967	Georgie Fame	Released: 2 June 1967; Label: CBS	2
2015	Soul	Released: 18 April 2015; Label: Polydor/UMC; Record Store Day release	—
"—" denotes releases that did not chart

== Singles ==
Year	Title (Note: Unless stated otherwise, the B-side is by the same artist as the A-side.)	Peak chart positions											Album	Label
Year	Title	UK	AUS	BE (FLA)	BE (WA)	CAN	GER	IRE	NL	NZ	SWE	US	Album	Label
1962	"Baby, Baby (Don't You Worry)" (by Perry Ford and the Sapphires with the Blue Flames) b/w "Prince of Fools"	—	—	—	—	—	—	—	—	—	—	—	Non-album single	Decca
1964	"Do the Dog" (with the Blue Flames) b/w "Shop Around"	—	—	—	—	—	—	—	—	—	—	—	Rhythm and Blues at the Flamingo	Columbia
1964	"Do-Re-Mi" (with the Blue Flames) b/w "Green Onions"	—	—	—	—	—	—	—	—	—	—	—	Non-album single Fame at Last!	Columbia
1964	"Bend a Little" b/w "I'm in Love with You"	—	—	—	—	—	—	—	—	—	—	—	Non-album single	Columbia
1964	"Yeh, Yeh" (with the Blue Flames) b/w "Preach and Teach"	1	14	—	19	1	—	3	—	—	6	21	Non-album single (Note: Both tracks were included on the US album Yeh Yeh.)	Columbia
1965	"In the Meantime" (with the Blue Flames) b/w "Telegram"	22	66	—	—	30	—	—	—	—	—	97	Non-album singles	Columbia
1965	"Like We Used to Be" (with the Blue Flames) b/w "It Ain't Right"	33	—	—	—	—	—	—	—	—	—	—	Non-album singles	Columbia
1965	"Something" (with the Blue Flames) b/w "Outrage"	23	—	—	—	—	—	—	—	—	—	—	Non-album singles	Columbia
1966	"Get Away" (with the Blue Flames) b/w "El Bandido"	1	40	—	—	1	32	6	20	10	7	70	Non-album single (Note: Both tracks were included on the US/Canada album Get Away.)	Columbia
1966	"Don't Worry" (with the Blue Flames) b/w "Talkin' in My Sleep"	—	—	—	—	—	—	—	—	—	—	—	Non-album singles	Columbia
1966	"Sunny" b/w "Don't Make Promises"	13	—	—	8	—	—	—	2	—	—	—	Non-album singles	Columbia
1966	"Sitting in the Park" b/w "Last Night"	12	92	—	—	—	—	—	— (Note: "Sitting in the Park" did not chart on the Single Top 100, but did peak at number 31 on Top 40)	—	—	—	Sweet Things (Note: Both tracks were included on the US/Canada album Get Away.)	Columbia
1967	"Because I Love You" b/w "Bidin' My Time ('Cos I Love You)"	15	—	—	—	—	—	—	—	—	—	—	Non-album singles	CBS
1967	"Knock on Wood" (Continental Europe-only release) (Note: "Knock on Wood" was released in the UK as a promo-only single with the B-side "No Thanks".) b/w "Road Runner"	—	—	—	—	—	—	—	—	—	—	—	Non-album singles	CBS
1967	"Try My World" b/w "No Thanks"	37	—	—	—	—	—	—	—	—	—	—	Non-album singles	CBS
1967	"The Ballad of Bonnie and Clyde" b/w "Beware of the Dog"	1	4	4	7	1	9	4	5	2	6	7	The Third Face of Fame Non-album track	CBS
1968	"By the Time I Get to Phoenix" b/w "For Your Pleasure"	51 (Note: Chart position is from the official UK "Breakers List".)	—	—	—	—	—	—	—	—	—	—	Non-album singles	CBS
1968	"Hideaway" (US and Canada-only release) b/w "Kentucky Child"	—	—	—	—	—	—	—	—	—	—	—	Non-album singles	Epic
1968	"Bullets Laverne" (Netherlands and Germany-only release) b/w "St. James Infirmary"	—	—	—	—	—	—	—	—	—	—	—	The Third Face of Fame	CBS
1968	"Someone to Watch Over Me" (US and Canada-only release) b/w "For Your Pleasure"	—	—	—	—	—	—	—	—	—	—	—	The Third Face of Fame Non-album track	Epic
1969	"Down Along the Cove" (US and Canada-only release) b/w "I'll Be Your Baby Tonight"	—	—	—	—	—	—	—	—	—	—	—	Non-album singles	Epic
1969	"Peaceful" b/w "Hideaway"	16	—	—	—	—	—	—	—	—	—	—	Non-album singles	CBS
1969	"Seventh Son" b/w "Fully Booked"	25	—	—	—	—	—	—	—	—	—	—	Seventh Son	CBS
1970	"Somebody Stole My Thunder" b/w "Entertaining Mr. Sloane"	—	—	—	—	—	—	—	—	—	—	—	Seventh Son Non-album track (Note: From the film of the same name.)	CBS
1970	"Fire and Rain" b/w "Someday Man"	—	—	—	—	—	—	—	—	—	—	—	Non-album single	CBS
1971	"Rosetta" (with Alan Price) b/w "John and Mary"	11	91	1	29	—	43	16	3	—	—	—	Fame & Price / Price & Fame / Together	CBS
1971	"Follow Me" (with Alan Price) b/w "Sergeant Jobsworth"	—	—	—	—	—	—	—	—	—	—	—	Non-album single	CBS
1972	"Hey Baby, I'm Getting Ready" b/w "City Hicker"	—	—	—	—	—	—	—	—	—	—	—	All Me Own Work	Reprise
1973	"Don't Hit Me When I'm Down" (with Alan Price) b/w "Street Lights"	—	—	—	—	—	—	—	—	—	—	—	Non-album single	Reprise
1974	"Everlovin' Woman" b/w " That Ol' Rock and Roll"	—	—	—	—	—	—	—	—	—	—	—	Georgie Fame	Island
1974	"Ali Shuffle" b/w "Round Two"	55	—	—	—	—	—	—	—	—	—	—	Non-album singles	Island
1976	"Yes Honestly" b/w "Lily"	—	—	—	—	—	—	—	—	—	—	—	Non-album singles	Island
1976	"Sweet Perfection" b/w "Thanking Heaven"	—	—	—	—	—	—	—	—	—	—	—	Non-album singles	Island
1977	"Daylight" b/w "Three Legged Mule" (with the Blue Flames)	—	—	—	—	—	—	—	—	—	—	—	Non-album singles	Island
1979	"A Different Dream" b/w "Ollie's Party"	—	—	—	—	—	—	—	—	—	—	—	Right Now!	Pye
1979	"Maybe Tomorrow" b/w "Cats Eyes"	—	—	—	—	—	—	—	—	—	—	—	That's What Friends Are For	Pye
1980	"Give a Little More" b/w "Give a Little More" (Dub Version)	—	—	—	—	—	—	—	—	—	—	—	Closing the Gap	Piccadilly
1981	"Drip-Drop!" (with Annie Ross) b/w "One Morning in May (Foxtrot)" (by the Famous Flamingo Orchestra)	—	—	—	—	—	—	—	—	—	—	—	In Hoagland 1981	Bald Eagle
1982	"Hong Kong Blues" (with Annie Ross) b/w "The Old Music Master" (with Annie Ross and the Famous Flamingo Orchestra)	—	—	—	—	—	—	—	—	—	—	—	In Hoagland 1981	Bald Eagle
1982	"The Hurricane" b/w "The Hurricane" (Part 2)	—	—	—	—	—	—	—	—	—	—	—	Non-album single	My
1983	"I Love Jamaica" (Germany-only release) b/w "Everything I Own"	—	—	—	—	—	—	—	—	—	—	—	I Love Jamaica (Note: German release of Closing the Gap.)	Telefunken
1984	"Swinging on a Star" (with Patti Boulaye) b/w "I Feel Like Loving You"	—	—	—	—	—	—	—	—	—	—	—	Non-album singles	Hollywood
1986	"New York Afternoon" (by Mondo Kané featuring Dee Lewis, Coral Gordon and Georgie Fame) b/w "Manhattan Morning" (by Mondo Kané)	70	—	—	—	—	—	—	—	—	—	—	Non-album singles	Lisson
1986	"Samba (Toda Menina Baiana)" b/w "Willow King"	81	—	—	—	—	—	—	—	—	—	—	Non-album singles	Ensign
1990	"Go for It" (Theme from Granada TV Series El C.I.D.) b/w "I Still Care About Us"	—	—	—	—	—	—	—	—	—	—	—	Non-album singles	Food for Thought
1992	"Moondance" (Germany-only release) b/w "Yeah Yeah"/"Georgia"	—	—	—	—	—	—	—	—	—	—	—	Cool Cat Blues	Go Jazz
1992	"Maybe It's Because of Love" (featuring Dr. John; Germany-only release) b/w "How Long Has This Been Going On"/"Roll with My Baby"	—	—	—	—	—	—	—	—	—	—	—	The Blues and Me	Go Jazz
1996	"That's Life" (by Van Morrison with Georgie Fame & Friends) b/w "Moondance"/"That's Life"	92	—	—	—	—	—	—	—	—	—	—	Non-album single How Long Has This Been Going On	Verve
2002	"Summertime in the Park" (Netherlands-only release)	—	—	—	—	—	—	—	—	—	—	—	Non-album single	Capitol
"—" denotes releases that did not chart or were not released in that territory
