= Here and Now and Sounding Good! =

Studio album by Dick Morrissey
- Released: 1966
- Recorded: 23 and 25 September 1966
- Genre: Jazz
- Label: Mercury Records 20093 MCL

Dick Morrissey chronology
Sonny Stitt / Live at Ronnie Scott's (1965)	Here and Now and Sounding Good! (1966)

Here and Now and Sounding Good!, released in 1966, was the sixth Dick Morrissey Quartet recording. The tracks included were a tribute to Dick Morrissey's friends and fellow British jazz musicians.

It was re-released as a CD in 2007.

== Track listing ==
1. "Off the Wagon" (Tubby Hayes)
2. "Corpus" (Ian Hamer)
3. "Don't Fall Over the Bridge" (Tubby Hayes)
4. "Sunday Lunch" (Dick Morrissey)
5. "Little Miss Sadly" (Stan Tracey)
6. "El Schtuck" (Harry South)

== Personnel ==
- Dick Morrissey - tenor sax
- Harry South - piano
- Phil Bates - double bass
- Bill Eyden - drums

== See also ==
- Dick Morrissey discography
