= Waterfall (If album) =

Studio album by If
- Released: September 1972
- Recorded: July 1972
- Studio: Morgan Studios, London
- Genre: Jazz rock; progressive rock
- Length: 36:18
- Label: Island; Metromedia
- Producer: Lew Futterman; Fiachra Trench

If chronology
If 4 (1972)	Waterfall (1972)	Double Diamond (1973)

Singles from Waterfall
- 1. "Waterfall" b/w "The Light Still Shines" Released: 1972

Professional ratings
Review scores
Source	Rating
Allmusic	4/5 stars

Waterfall is the fifth album released for the American market by the English jazz rock band If. It was first issued in 1972 and reached #195 on the Billboard Pop Albums Chart.

It is a rearranged version of If 4, containing two tracks, "Paint Your Pictures" and "Cast No Shadows", in substitution of "You in Your Small Corner" and "Svenska Soma", which had been released on IF 4. The original recording line-up was modified to include two new members, Cliff Davies and Dave Wintour, who filled the drum and bass chairs in substitution of Dennis Elliott and Jim Richardson, respectively.

The album was recorded in London at Command Studios in February and at Morgan Studios in July 1972.

== Track listing ==
1. "Waterfall" (D. Morrissey, B. Morrissey) – 5:42
2. "The Light Still Shines" (Quincy, Humphrey) – 5:06
3. "Sector 17" (Quincy) – 8:00
4. "Paint Your Pictures" (D. Morrissey, B. Morrissey) – 5:18
5. "Cast No Shadows" (Davies) – 7:30
6. "Throw Myself to the Wind" (D. Morrissey, B. Morrissey) – 4:42

Bonus tracks on CD release from 2003:

1. "You in Your Small Corner" (Humphries, Quincy) – 3:28
2. "Waterfall" (Morrissey, Morrissey) – 4:02
3. "Waterfall" (Morrissey, Morrissey) – 4:00

== Personnel ==
- Cliff Davies – drums
- Dennis Elliott – drums
- J.W. Hodgkinson – vocals, percussion
- John Mealing – piano, organ
- Dick Morrissey – saxophones, flute, vocals
- Dave Quincy – saxophones
- Jim Richardson – bass
- Terry Smith – guitar
- Dave Wintour – electric guitar & acoustic guitar, bass, vocals
