= If (If album) =

Studio album by If
- Released: October 1970
- Recorded: February, March and April 1970
- Studios: Island Studios, London
- Genres: Jazz rock, progressive rock
- Length: 37:06
- Labels: Island; Capitol
- Producer: Lew Futterman

If chronology
| If (1970) | If 2 (1971) |

Singles from If
- 1. "Raise the Level of Your Conscious Mind" b/w "I'm Reaching Out on All Sides" Released: November 1970

Professional ratings
Review scores
| Source | Rating |
|---|---|
| AllMusic | 4/5 stars |

If, often referred to as If 1, is the debut album by English jazz rock band If. It was released in October 1970 on the Island Records label in the UK and Capitol Records in the US. The original artwork and the if logo, which was an award-winning design, were by CCS Advertising Associates.

It was re-issued as a CD first in 1995 by an obscure label (OSA), then in 1997 by Island and finally in 2006 on Repertoire Records with two bonus tracks and liner notes by UK music critic Chris Welch.

== Track listing ==
=== Side one ===
1. "I'm Reaching Out on All Sides" (Quincy, Fishman) – 5:14
2. "What Did I Say About the Box, Jack?" (Dick Morrissey) – 8:20
3. "What Can a Friend Say?" (Dave Quincy) – 6:28

=== Side two ===
1. "Woman Can You See (What This Big Thing Is All About)" (J. W. Hodkinson) – 4:01
2. "Raise the Level of Your Conscious Mind" (Fishman, Marsala) – 3:11
3. "Dockland" (Daryl Runswick) – 5:21
4. "The Promised Land" (Dave Quincy) – 4:31

=== Bonus tracks on the Repertoire issue ===
1. "Raise the Level of Your Conscious Mind" (single version) (Fishman, Marsala) – 3:17
2. "I'm Reaching Out on All Sides" (single version) (Quincy, Fishman) – 5:44

== Personnel ==
- J. W. Hodkinson – lead vocals, percussion
- Dick Morrissey – tenor and soprano saxophones, flute
- Dave Quincy – tenor and alto saxophones, flute
- Terry Smith – guitar
- John Mealing – organ, backing vocals, piano
- Jim Richardson – bass
- Dennis Elliott – drums
- Frank Owen – Sound
