= Sound Venture =

Studio album by Georgie Fame
- Released: October 1966
- Recorded: 1966
- Genre: Jazz, R&B
- Label: Columbia
- Producer: Denny Cordell, Tony Palmer

Georgie Fame UK chronology
Sweet Things (1966)	Sound Venture (1966)	The Two Faces of Fame (1967)

Sound Venture is a jazz album recorded by Georgie Fame and the Harry South Big Band in 1966. Featuring many of Britain's top jazz musicians, and arranged by big band arranger Harry South, it marked a departure from Fame's R&B hits with the Blue Flames. The record peaked at number 9 on the national albums chart in the UK.

The album includes cover versions of songs by King Curtis and James Brown, as well as compositions written by Fame (credited under his real name, Clive Powell). While its commercial performance paled against his previous releases, Sound Venture earned Fame artistic credibility and resulted in a joint tour with American jazz musician Count Basie.

Elvis Costello, in a 1999 interview for Mojo magazine, described the impact the album made on him:

In 1966 I was 12 and already a big Georgie Fame fan. I'd got Yeh Yeh and Getaway and In The Meantime and I loved the Fame At Last EP. I saved up for a few weeks to buy Sound Venture … It was such a hip record. Apart from anything else it had such a great title! And Georgie plays killer organ. I'd been used to the sound of the big band but this was different. There was no strict dance tempo and it wasn't smooth like Joe Loss – this was a swinging band and the line-up was a who's who of the jazz scene. It had a huge impact on me because the songs were all over the place from James Brown to Willie Nelson. He was one of the first British R&B artists to discover James Brown, which was a big deal then because the only pop we heard was Brian Matthew four hours a week on the radio – the rest of the time it was tea-dance music, the Palm Court orchestra and Geraldo. There was no way we could have any personal knowledge of those original artists – and if we did the records were too expensive and I was too young to go to clubs to see them. Every record changes you a little, but Sound Venture knocked a wall down for me.

== Track listing ==
1. "Many Happy Returns" (Norman "Hurricane" Smith)
2. "Down for the Count" (Jon Hendricks, Dave Lambert, Freddie Green)
3. "It's for Love the Petals Fall" (Jack Ashford)
4. "I Am Missing You" (Clive Powell)
5. "Funny How Time Slips Away" (Willie Nelson)
6. "Lil' Pony" (Neal Hefti, Hendricks)
7. "Lovey Dovey" (King Curtis, Ahmet Ertegün)
8. "Lil' Darlin'" (Hefti, Hendricks)
9. "Three Blind Mice" (Hendricks)
10. "Dawn Yawn" (Powell)
11. "Feed Me" (Hendricks)
12. "Papa's Got a Brand New Bag" (James Brown)

== Personnel ==
Musicians

- Georgie Fame – vocals, keyboards
- Tubby Hayes – saxophone
- Ronnie Scott – tenor saxophone
- Alan Branscombe – saxophone
- Tony Coe – saxophone
- Harry Klein – saxophone
- Dick Morrissey – tenor saxophone
- Jackie Sharp – saxophone
- Ray Warleigh – saxophone
- Ray Wilcox – saxophone
- Kenny Wheeler – trumpet
- Jimmy Deuchar – trumpet
- Bert Courtley – trumpet
- Tony Fisher – trumpet
- Ian Hamer – trumpet
- Keith Christie – trombone
- Ken Goldie – trombone
- Phil Seamen – drums
- Bill Eyden – drums
- Phil Bates – bass
- Colin Green – guitar
- Stan Tracey – keyboards
- Harry South – arranger, conductor

Other credits

- Denny Cordell – producer
- Tony Palmer – producer
- Chris Welch – sleevenotes
- Dave Redfern – photographs
