= If 4 =

Studio album by If
- Released: September 1972 (No U.S. release)
- Genre: Jazz rock; progressive rock
- Length: 36:56
- Label: Island
- Producer: Lew Futterman

If chronology
If 3 (1971)	If 4 (1972)	Waterfall (1972)

Singles from If 4
- 1. "You in Your Small Corner" b/w "Waterfall" Released: 1972

If 4 is the fourth album released by the English jazz rock band If. It was first issued in 1972 and the last album to feature the original recording line-up. Capitol Records, the band's U.S. label, declined to issue this fourth album. Most of the tracks on this album were issued in the U.S. on Waterfall, in a slightly different form (and with a new line-up), by Metromedia Records.

If 4 was reissued in CD by Repertoire in 2007.

== Track listing ==
=== Side one ===
1. "Sector 17" (Quincy) – 10:34
2. "The Light Still Shines" (Quincy, Humphrey) – 5:06
3. "You in Your Small Corner" (Quincy, Humphrey) – 3:49

=== Side two ===
1. "Waterfall" (D. Morrissey, B. Morrissey) – 5:27
2. "Throw Myself to the Wind" (D. Morrissey, B. Morrissey) – 4:51
3. "Svenska Soma" (Jonsson-Smith) – 7:09

== Personnel ==
- Dennis Elliott – drums
- J.W. Hodgkinson – vocals, percussion
- John Mealing – keyboards
- Dick Morrissey – saxophones, flute
- Dave Quincy – saxophones
- Jim Richardson – bass
- Terry Smith – guitar
