= If 3 =

Studio album by If
- Released: August 1971
- Recorded: 1971
- Genre: Jazz rock; progressive rock
- Length: 39:32
- Label: United Artists (U.K.); Capitol (U.S.)
- Producer: Jon Child; If

If chronology
If 2 (1971)	If 3 (1971)	If 4 (1972)

Singles from If 3
- 1. "Far Beyond" b/w "Forgotten Roads" Released: August 1971

Professional ratings
Review scores
Source	Rating
Allmusic	3/5 stars

If 3 is the third release by the English jazz rock band If. It was released in August 1971 by United Artists Records (U.K.) and Capitol Records (U.S.) and reached #171 on the Billboard Pop Albums Chart. It was reissued in CD in 2006 by Bodyheat with 2 bonus tracks, then by Repertoire in 2007 with 2 different bonus tracks.

The track "Forgotten Roads" featured on the band's live appearance on German TV's Beat-Club in September 1971.

The track "Here Comes Mr. Time" was included on the United Artists Records promotional sampler All Good Clean Fun (1971).

== Track listing ==
=== Side one ===
1. "Fibonacci's Number" (Quincy) – 7:38
2. "Forgotten Roads" (Quincy, Preston) – 4:23
3. "Sweet January" (Quincy, Preston) – 4:30
4. "Child of Storm" (Quincy, Hodkinson) – 3:39

=== Side two ===
1. "Far Beyond" (Mealing, Preston) – 4:57
2. "Seldom Seen Sam" (Smith, Hodkinson) – 4:50
3. "Upstairs" (B. Morrissey, D. Morrissey) – 4:52
4. "Here Comes Mr. Time" (Mealing, Preston) – 4:43

=== Bonus tracks on 2006 CD release ===
1. "What Did I Say About the Box Jack?" (studio version) (D. Morrissey) – 8:24
2. "What Did I Say About the Box Jack?" (live version) (D. Morrissey) – 20:23

(live version recorded during a European Tour in 1972 and reissued also in "If Europe '72" (Repertoire, 1997)

=== Bonus tracks on 2007 CD release ===
1. "Forgotten Roads" (single version) (Preston, Quincy) – 4:03
2. "Far Beyond" (single version) (Mealing, Preston) – 3:53

("Forgotten Roads" reissued also in "More Live If" (Repertoire, 2010)

== Personnel ==
- J.W. Hodkinson – lead vocals, percussion
- Dick Morrissey – tenor and soprano saxophones, backing vocals, flute
- Dave Quincy – tenor and alto saxophones, flute
- Terry Smith – guitar
- John Mealing – organ, backing vocals, electric piano
- Jim Richardson – bass
- Dennis Elliott – drums
