= If 2 =

Studio album by If
- Released: February 1971
- Recorded: The Hit Factory, NY
- Genre: Jazz rock; progressive rock
- Length: 36:32
- Label: Island; Capitol
- Producer: Lew Futterman

If chronology
If (1970)	If 2 (1971)	If 3 (1971)

Singles from If 2
- 1. "Your City Is Falling" Released: March 1971

Professional ratings
Review scores
Source	Rating
Allmusic	4/5 stars

If 2 is the second release by the English Jazz rock band If. It was released in 1970 on the Island Records label in the UK and Capitol Records in the US.

The album features the early use of Innovex Reed Sound Modulators for the saxophones. The single from the album was "Your City Is Falling".

It was re-issued as a CD first in 1996 by an obscure label (OSA), then in 1997 by Island and finally in 2012 on Repertoire Records with liner notes by UK music critic Chris Welch and containing a bonus DVD of four songs recorded live at the Mountford Hall, Liverpool University, 1 July 1971.

== Track listing ==
=== Side one ===
1. "Your City Is Falling" (Dave Quincy) – 5:04
2. "Sunday Sad" (Dick Morrissey) – 8:18
3. "Tarmac T. Pirate and the Lonesome Nymphomaniac" (John Mealing, Trevor Preston) – 5:12

=== Side two ===
1. "I Couldn't Write and Tell You" (Dave Quincy) – 8:23
2. "Shadows and Echoes" (Margaret Busby, Lionel Grigson) – 4:24
3. "Song for Elsa, Three Days Before Her 25th Birthday" (J. W. Hodkinson, Morrissey) – 5:11

Bonus DVD

1. "Your City Is Falling (Live)"
2. "Sunday Sad (Live)"
3. "I Couldn't Write And Tell You (Live)"
4. "Forgotten Roads (Live)"

== Personnel ==
- J. W. Hodkinson – lead vocals, percussion
- Dick Morrissey – tenor and soprano saxophone, flute
- Dave Quincy – tenor and alto saxophones, flute
- Terry Smith – guitar
- John Mealing – organ, backing vocals, electric piano
- Jim Richardson – bass
- Dennis Elliott – drums

=== Production ===
- engineer – Frank Owen, Jon Child
- producer – Lew Futterman
