= What the Dickens! =

Studio album by Johnny Dankworth, his Orchestra and Guests
- Released: 1963
- Genre: Jazz
- Label: Fontana Records

What the Dickens! is a 1963 recording by Johnny Dankworth, accompanied by his orchestra and guests, some of the leading UK jazz musicians of the day. It is a suite based on characters and scenarios associated with Charles Dickens. It was recorded in London on 29 and 31 July, 7 August and 4 October 1963, and released as a vinyl album. What the Dickens! was bundled with Off Duty in a 2012 reissue.

== Track listing ==
1. "Prologue" (2:26)
2. "Weller Never Did" Pickwick Papers (1:58)
3. "Little Nell" The Old Curiosity Shop (2:51)
4. "The Infant Phenomenon" Nicholas Nickleby (2:12)
5. "Demdest Little Fascinator" Nicholas Nickleby (3:09)
6. "Dotheboys Hall" Oliver Twist (4:24)
7. "Ghosts" A Christmas Carol (2:23)
8. "David and the Bloaters" David Copperfield (2:57)
9. "Please Sir, I Want Some More" Oliver Twist (2:01)
10. "The Artful Dodger" Oliver Twist (1:39)
11. "Waiting for Something to Turn Up" David Copperfield (2:46)
12. "Dodson and Fogg" Pickwick Papers (1:55)
13. "The Pickwick Club" Pickwick Papers (3:15)
14. "Serjeant Buzfuz" Pickwick Papers (2:15)
15. "Finale" (2:29)

== Personnel ==
=== Guests ===
- Tubby Hayes – tenor saxophone
- Ronnie Ross - baritone saxophone
- Ronnie Scott - tenor saxophone
- Dick Morrissey – tenor saxophone
- Jimmy Deuchar - trumpet
- Ron Stephenson – drums
- Bobby Wellins – tenor saxophone
- Ken Napper – bass
- Tony Coe - tenor saxophone, clarinet
- Peter King - tenor saxophone
- David Snell - harp

=== Orchestra ===
- Leader: John Dankworth
- Gus Galbraith - trumpet
- Leon Calvert - trumpet, flugelhorn
- Dickie Hawdon - trumpet, tenor horn
- Kenny Wheeler - trumpet, tenor horn
- Tony Russell - trombone
- Eddie Harvey - valve trombone
- Ron Snyder - tuba
- Roy East - alto saxophone, flute, clarinet
- John Dankworth - alto saxophone, clarinet
- Vic Ash - tenor saxophone, clarinet
- Art Ellefson - tenor saxophone, bass clarinet
- Alan Branscombe - vibraphone, xylophone, piano
- Spike Heatley - basses
- Johnny Butts - drums
- Roy Webster - percussion
