= Bill Eyden =

English jazz drummer

Bill Eyden Bill Eyden
- Born: William James Eyden; 4 May 1930; Hounslow, Middlesex, England
- Died: 15 October 2004 (aged 74) Isleworth, London, England
- Genres: Jazz, rock
- Occupation: Drummer
- Instrument: Drums
- Formerly of: Procol Harum

William James Eyden (4 May 1930 – 15 October 2004) was an English jazz drummer.

== Biography ==
The son of James Eyden and Ivy (née Tiller), his first professional gig was in 1952 with the Ivor and Basil Kirchin Band. He was soon working with Ray Kirkwood and Johnny Rogers, and appeared on TV in 1953 with the pianist Steve Race. In 1955 Eyden met Tubby Hayes, with whom he would play regularly for the next two decades, joining Hayes and Ronnie Scott in The Jazz Couriers. When the Couriers folded in 1959, he went on to play with the Vic Ash-Harry Klein Quintet, supporting Miles Davis on his first British tour in 1960. He was also a member of the Ray Ellington Quartet when it worked on The Goon Show, appearing on the video of the reunion programme The Last Goon Show of All.

Eyden joined Georgie Fame and the Blue Flames in September 1964 and remained until December 1965. He joined the Dick Morrissey Quartet, replacing Phil Seamen, and did session work for various rock and R&B groups, including Procol Harum on their seminal hit "A Whiter Shade of Pale." He was a member of the resident trio, led by Stan Tracey, at Ronnie Scott's club until the late 1960s.

Eyden also played or recorded with Dizzy Reece, Jimmy Deuchar, Dickie Hawdon, Harry South, Ian Hamer, Keith Christie, Terry Brown, Bobby Wellins, Jimmy Skidmore, Joe Mudele, Roy Fox, Harry Roy, Long John Baldry, Alexis Korner and others. During the 1980s he was a member of Bill Le Sage's Bebop Preservation Society and until the onset of a lengthy illness he played in quintets led by Jack Honeyborne and Ken Baldock.

== Discography ==
- Sonny Stitt / Live at Ronnie Scott's (May 1965) - Dick Morrissey Quartet
- Here and Now and Sounding Good! (September 1966) - Dick Morrissey Quartet
- A Whiter Shade of Pale (April/May 1967) - Procol Harum
- The Greatest Little Soul Band in the Land (1969) - J.J. Jackson
- Live at the Bull - Tribute Vols. 1-2 (recorded live 1987/8 - released 2007): - Dick Morrissey, Spike Robinson, Bill Le Sage, Alec Dankworth, Bill Eyden and others.
