= Sonny Stitt / Live at Ronnie Scott's =

Live album by Sonny Stitt
- Released: 1995
- Recorded: May 1964
- Genre: Jazz
- Label: Ronnie Scott's Jazz House

Sonny Stitt / Live at Ronnie Scott's is a live album of Sonny Stitt. It was recorded at Ronnie Scott's Jazz Club, London in 1995.

JazzTimes noted in its review, "It is an injustice to the memory of a splendid musician to release an album made of ad hoc tapes from a failed performance."

== Track listing ==
1. "Ernest's Blues"
2. "Home Sweet Home"
3. "M-O-T-H-E-R"
4. "My Mother's Eyes"
5. "Sonny's Theme Song"
6. "Blues with Dick and Harry"
7. "It Could Happen to You" (Johnny Burke and Jimmy Van Heusen)
8. "Oh, Lady Be Good!" (George and Ira Gershwin)
9. Interview with Sonny Stitt

== Personnel ==
- Sonny Stitt - tenor sax
- Ernest Ranglin - Guitar
- Dick Morrissey - tenor sax
- Harry South - piano
- Phil Bates - double bass
- Bill Eyden - drums
