= If (band) =

British progressive/jazz rock band

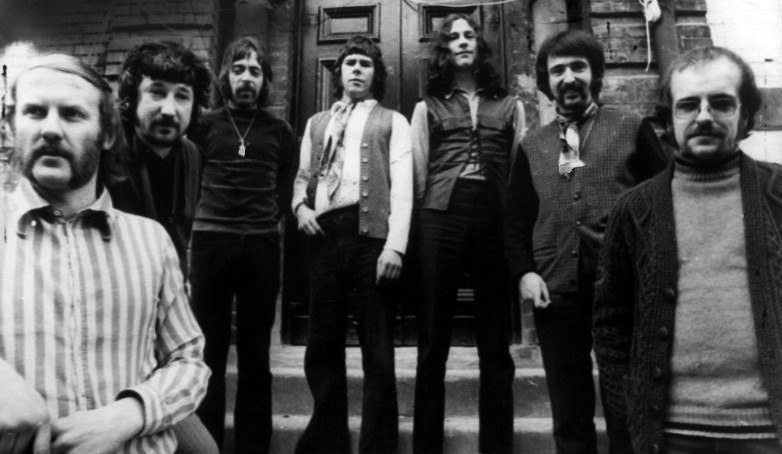
- The band in 1970; from left to right: Dave Quincy, Dick Morrissey, Terry Smith, J.W. Hodkinson, Dennis Elliott, John Mealing, Jim Richardson.

Background information
- Origin: England
- Genres: Jazz rock; jazz fusion; progressive rock
- Years active: 1969–1975, 2015–2016
- Labels: Island, Capitol, United Artists, Metromedia
- Past members: Dick Morrissey; J.W. Hodkinson; Dave Quincy; Terry Smith; Lionel Grigson; Daryl Runswick; Spike Wells; John Mealing; Jim Richardson; Dennis Elliott; Cliff Davies; Dave Greenslade; Dave Wintour; Pete Arnesen; Kurt Palomacki; Steve Rosenthal; Fiachra Trench; Gabriel Magno; Walt Monaghan; Mike Tomich; Geoff Whitehorn

If were a British progressive rock and jazz rock band formed in 1969. In the period spanning 1970–75, they released eight studio-recorded albums and undertook 17 tours of Europe, the US and Canada. The band were acclaimed by George Knemeyer in a Billboard concert review as "unquestionably the best of the so-called jazz-rock bands".

== History ==
3D-block logo of If, used from 1970 to 1973; revived in 2016

The band was formed in 1969 by Dave Quincy, Dick Morrissey, and Terry Smith. They were managed by Lew Futterman, who was also the band's album producer. Signed by Chris Blackwell to Island Records in the UK and to Capitol Records in the US, their debut album, If (1970), entered the charts in both the States (Billboard) and the UK. The second album, If 2, was released the following year. They toured in Europe and the United States during the early 1970s, with two US tours during their first year, performing at Newport Jazz Festival, Reading Festival, and the Fillmore East (10 November 1970). They also shared billing with acts such as Rory Gallagher, Rush, Kiss, The Eagles, Free, Bo Diddley, Strawbs, REO Speedwagon, Electric Light Orchestra, Lynyrd Skynyrd, Frank Zappa and the Mothers of Invention, Uriah Heep, Grand Funk Railroad, Rod Stewart, The Faces, Black Sabbath, Taste, Brinsley Schwarz, Atomic Rooster, Traffic, Mott the Hoople, Black Oak Arkansas and many more.

The albums If 3 (1971) and If 4 (titled Waterfall in US with one different track) (1972) were accompanied by heavy touring schedules in the States and Europe, especially in Britain and Germany, where the band appeared on TV (BBC's Top of the Pops/Old Grey Whistle Test in the UK) and one of their tracks was used as a signature tune for the news in Germany, as well as performing live (September 1971) on Bremen TV's Beat-Club. In the summer of 1972, the band cancelled the remainder of a US tour when Dick Morrissey was admitted to hospital for surgery. During this period, the band members worked on other projects.

Consisting of essentially two clearly defined line-ups, as well as an intermediate, transitional one, the original band had a heavier leaning towards jazz, and was formed by Dick Morrissey, on tenor sax and flute, and Terry Smith on guitars, both Melody Maker award-winning British jazz musicians who had played together in US soul singer J.J. Jackson's band with Dave Quincy on alto and tenor saxes, together with Spike Wells on drums, Lionel Grigson on keyboards and Daryl Runswick on bass, although these last three musicians did not record with the band, with Wells going off to join Tubby Hayes.

The definitive seven-piece line-up for the first incarnation of the band, with a more jazz-rock-oriented style, and which appears on the first four studio albums, as well as a live recording, was J. W. Hodkinson on lead vocals, John Mealing on keyboards, Jim Richardson on electric bass, Dennis Elliott on drums, with Dave Quincy on alto and tenor saxes, Terry Smith on guitars, and Dick Morrissey on tenor and soprano saxes and flute.

The above line-up is possibly the band's best known, but the band was subject to other personnel changes. With If coming off the road when Dick Morrissey was admitted to hospital, J. W. Hodkinson joined Darryl Way's Wolf, Terry Smith and Dave Quincy went off to form ZZebra, John Mealing joined Klaus Doldinger's Passport before going on to Strawbs, Jim Richardson went on to do studio session work, and Dennis Elliott joined the hugely successful group Foreigner.

A new line-up had Fi Trench and Dave Greenslade (ex-Colosseum) on keyboards, and Dave Wintour replacing Richardson on bass. Wintour left shortly afterwards to join Roger Daltrey, appearing on his first two solo albums.

A sixth studio album, Double Diamond (1973), with only Dick Morrissey left from the original line-up, featured Fi Trench (keyboards) and Pete Arnesen (keyboards), Steve Rosenthal (guitar/lead vocals), Kurt Palomacki (bass) and Cliff Davies (drums). It was recorded at The Manor recording studios shortly after Mike Oldfield's Tubular Bells.

The last two If albums, Not Just Another Bunch of Pretty Faces (1974) and Tea Break Over, Back on Your 'Eads (1974), saw the band back on Capitol Records, and decidedly more rock-oriented. They featured Geoff Whitehorn on guitars and vocals, Gabriel Magno on keyboards and Walt Monaghan on bass and vocals (replacing Mike Tomich, who had toured with the band prior to these last recordings), as well as Cliff Davies and Dick Morrissey.

Coinciding with their more rock-influenced style, they also changed their famous small-case logo "if" for the more solid-looking large-case "IF".

If finally broke up in 1975, Dick Morrissey going on to work with the Average White Band and Herbie Mann, eventually forming Morrissey–Mullen; Geoff Whitehorn to join Crawler and, subsequently, Procol Harum. Other members worked with Ted Nugent, who was also produced by Lew Futterman: Gabriel Magno (1973–1974), Cliff Davies (1975–1980) and Walt Monaghan (1979).

Following the interest generated in the band with the re-release of If, If 2, If 3, and If 4, Dave Quincy and Terry Smith announced the re-formation of If in 2015 with a new line-up. A new album was released in 2016 and was titled If 5.

The latest release is 2022; IF live at the BBC (two disks, 20 tracks) on Repertoire Records UK LTD. Includes John Peel show. Dave Lee Travis show. Sounds of the 70's and a live radio one concert July 1972.

== Band members ==
1969	J. W. Hodkinson – lead vocals, percussion; Dick Morrissey – saxophones, flute; Dave Quincy – saxophones, flute; Terry Smith – guitar; Lionel Grigson – keyboards, backing vocals; Daryl Runswick – bass; Spike Wells – drums
1969–72	J. W. Hodkinson – lead vocals, percussion; Dick Morrissey – saxophones, flute; Dave Quincy – saxophones, flute; Terry Smith – guitar; John Mealing – piano, backing vocals, organ; Jim Richardson – bass; Dennis Elliott – drums
1972–73	J. W. Hodkinson – lead vocals, percussion; Dick Morrissey – saxophones, backing vocals, flute; Dave Quincy – saxophones, flute; Terry Smith – guitar; John Mealing – piano, organ; Jim Richardson – bass; Dennis Elliott – drums; Dave Wintour – electric and acoustic guitar, backing vocals, bass; Dave Greenslade – keyboards; Cliff Davies – drums
1973–74	Dick Morrissey – saxophones, lead and backing vocals, flute; Cliff Davies – drums, backing vocals; Steve Rosenthal – guitar, lead and backing vocals; Pete Arnesen – piano, backing vocals, organ, synthesizers; Fi Trench – piano, backing vocals; Kurt Palomacki – bass, backing vocals
1974–75	Dick Morrissey – saxes, flute; Cliff Davies – drums, synthesizer, vocals; Geoff Whitehorn – guitars, vocals; Gabriel Magno – piano, organ; Walt Monaghan – bass, vocals
2015–16	Dave Quincy – saxophone; Terry Smith – guitar; Dave Browne – vocals; Guy Gardner – keyboards; Ben Taylor – bass; Rod Brown – drums

== Discography ==
=== Studio albums ===
- If (Island, 1970) US No. 187
- If 2 (Island, 1971) US No. 203
- If 3 (United Artists, 1971) US No. 171
- If 4 (United Artists, 1972)
- Waterfall (Metromedia, 1972) US No. 195
- Double Diamond (Metromedia, 1973)
- Not Just Another Bunch of Pretty Faces (Gull, 1974)
- Tea Break Over–Back on Your 'Eads! (Gull, 1975)
- If 5 (Repertoire, 2016)

=== EPs ===
- A Little Taste of If (Capitol, 1974) – sampler of Not Just Another Bunch of Pretty Faces

=== Compilation albums ===
- Forgotten Roads (Sequel, 1995)
- Europe '72 (Repertoire, 1997)

=== Live albums ===
- Fibonacci's Number: More Live (Repertoire, 2010)
- IF Live at the BBC (Repertoire records UK limited, 2022)
