= Have You Heard (Dick Morrissey album) =

Have You Heard?

Studio album by Dick Morrissey
- Released: 1963
- Recorded: July–August 1963
- Studio: Dubreq Studios, London
- Genre: Jazz
- Label: 77 Records 77LEU12/8 (JMC35)
- Producer: Doug Dobell

Dick Morrissey chronology
It’s Morrissey, Man! (1961)	Have You Heard? (1963)	There and Back (1964/65)

Have You Heard? is the second Dick Morrissey Quartet album. It was recorded July/August 1963 and released on Doug Dobell's 77 Records label.

== Track listing ==
1. "Down Home"
2. "Skatin'"
3. "The Goblin"
4. "The Celt"
5. "Serenata"
6. "On the Spot"
7. "There and Back"
8. "Journey Home"

== Personnel ==
- Dick Morrissey - tenor saxophone
- Harry South - piano
- Phil Bates - double bass
- Jackie Dougan - drums
