= It's Morrissey, Man! =

Studio album by Dick Morrissey
- Released: 1961
- Recorded: 27 April 1961
- Genre: Jazz
- Label: Fontana

Dick Morrissey chronology
It's Morrissey, Man! (1961)	Have You Heard? (1963)

It's Morrissey, Man! is an album by saxophonist Dick Morrissey. It was recorded on 27 April 1961. It was Morrissey's first album as a leader. The liner notes were written by Benny Green. In 1998, Polygram's Redial division, run by Richard Cook, reissued the album as a CD.

== Reception ==
A contemporaneous Jazz Journal review commented: "Morrissey is well able to sustain interest over several choruses, and builds his solos excellently. Jones [on piano] is far less impressive, and his solos are almost invariably an anticlimax. Cecil and Barnes [bass and drums] work together well, and provide a driving beat." Four decades later, a Daily Telegraph writer stated that the album had "caused a great stir among musicians and jazz insiders but failed to register greatly with the wider jazz public".

== Track listing ==
1. "St. Thomas" (Sonny Rollins) 3:54
2. "Cherry Blue" (Bill Le Sage) 3:13
3. "A Bench in the Park" (Milton Ager, Jack Yellen) 3:06
4. "Sancticity" (Coleman Hawkins) 3:27
5. "Mildew" (Johnny Griffin) 3:00
6. "Puffing Billy" (Stan Jones) 4:23
7. "Gurney Was Here (Or Blue Waltz)" (Jones) 2:48
8. "Happy Feet" (Ager, Yellen) 3:07
9. "Where Is Love?" (Lionel Bart) 3:57
10. "Dancing in the Dark" (Arthur Schwartz, Howard Dietz) 3:37
11. "Willow Weep for Me" (Ann Ronell) 4:50
12. "Jellyroll" (Charles Mingus) 2:59

== Personnel ==
- Dick Morrissey - tenor saxophone
- Stan Jones - piano
- Malcolm Cecil - bass
- Colin Barnes - drums
