= Geoff Whitehorn =

English guitarist and singer-songwriter (born 1951)

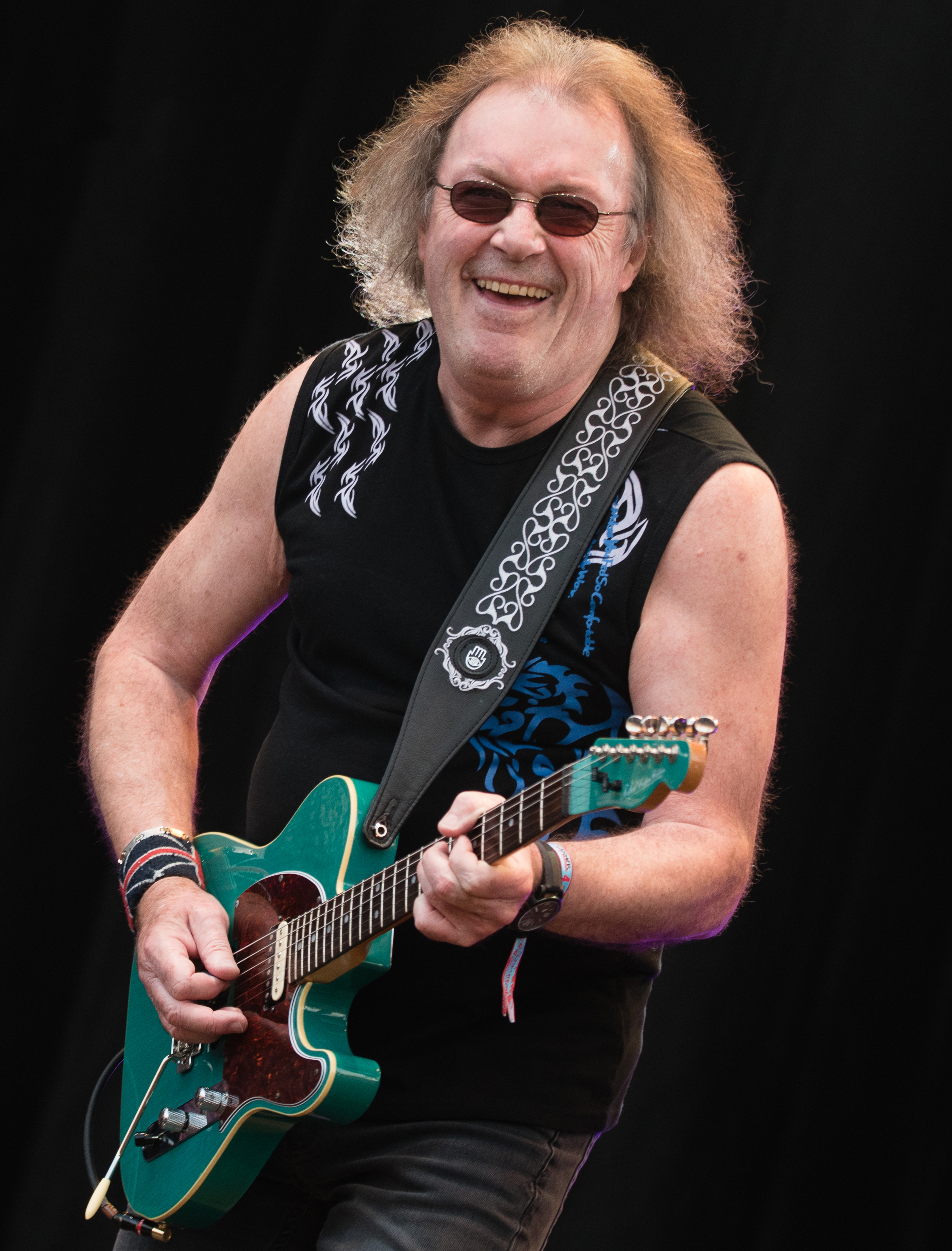
- Whitehorn in 2018

Background information
- Born: Geoffrey Charles Whitehorn; 29 August 1951; London, England
- Died: 19 November 2026 (aged 75) Dartford, England
- Genres: Progressive rock; jazz rock; hard rock
- Occupations: Musician; songwriter
- Instruments: Guitar; vocals
- Years active: 1973–2026
- Formerly of: Procol Harum; If; Crawler; Fantasy

Geoffrey Charles Whitehorn (29 August 1951 – 19 November 2026) was an English guitarist and singer-songwriter, who played as a member of If, Crawler and Procol Harum.

== History ==
In August 1973, Whitehorn joined the pioneering British jazz-rock band, If, in what was their third and final line-up, appearing on their last two albums, Not Just Another Bunch of Pretty Faces (1974) and Tea Break Over, Back on Your 'Eads (1975). During that period, he recorded his first solo album, Whitehorn (1974, Stateside), featuring fellow If members Dick Morrissey and Cliff Davies. This was followed by two largely instrumental solo albums, Big in Gravesend and Geoff Who? which he also re-recorded and expanded as Geoff Who? 2002. In 1976–1979, Whitehorn played in the band Crawler (formerly known as Back Street Crawler), replacing the band's founder Paul Kossoff after the latter's death.

He also played as lead guitarist with Chuck Farley besides Steve Simpson, Boz Burrell, Poli Palmer and Alan Coulter.

In 1979 Whitehorn joined Roger Chapman' s band The Shortlist, touring Europe extensively and recording ten albums with Chapman. His playing in the band was inspired by jazz. He left Shortlist in 1988.

In 1991, he joined the group Procol Harum, and was their second longest serving member (after founder Gary Brooker), having played on all of their recent recordings, such as The Long Goodbye, One More Time - Live in Utrecht 1992, The Well's on Fire and Novum as well as on Procol Harum's live DVDs in Denmark and at Union Chapel (concert on 12 December 2003), and one recorded with an orchestra in 2006 at Ledreborg Castle, again in Denmark. He also played live and recorded with The Palers' Project, the Procol Harum quasi-tribute collective. He changed his style into a more classic rock solo performance.

Whitehorn also contributed to the recordings and performances of other artists, such as Bad Company, Jethro Tull, Kevin Ayers, Elkie Brooks, The Who, Roger Waters, Manfred Mann's Earth Band, Paul McCartney, Eric Burdon, Billy Ocean and Paul Rodgers. In 2007, he worked with Elkie Brooks on her UK tour. Subsequently Whitehorn played regularly with Gambler and, more recently, The Strumbums.

He died as a result of complications arising from cancer treatment on 19 November 2026.
