= Dennis Elliott =

British musician & artist (born 1950)

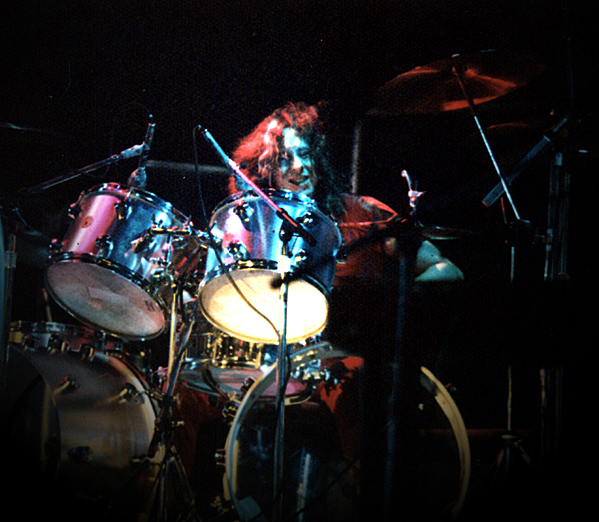
- Elliott performing with Foreigner in 1977

Background information
- Born: Dennis Leslie Eliott; 18 August 1950 (age 76); Peckham, London, England
- Instrument: Drums
- Years active: 1968–present

Dennis Leslie Elliott (born 18 August 1950) is a British musician and artist who was the original drummer for the rock band Foreigner. He played with the band from 1976 until leaving between 1991 and 1993. He went on to become a sculptor.

== Life and career ==
Dennis Leslie Elliott was born in Peckham, London. He played the drums with his family band at age five in shows around London. As a teenager, he joined The Tea Set with his older brother Raymond, who sang and played trumpet. After The Tea Set, he became a member of The Shevelles at age sixteen. At eighteen, he played in the band Ferris Wheel and on their album of the same name. When he was nineteen, Dennis joined the jazz/rock band If and recorded four LPs with the ensemble. They continually toured Europe and the US, where he met and later married Iona Elliott on 2 March 1972. Later that year, Dennis joined The Roy Young Band, touring the UK and Europe and recording four singles with that band over the following year.

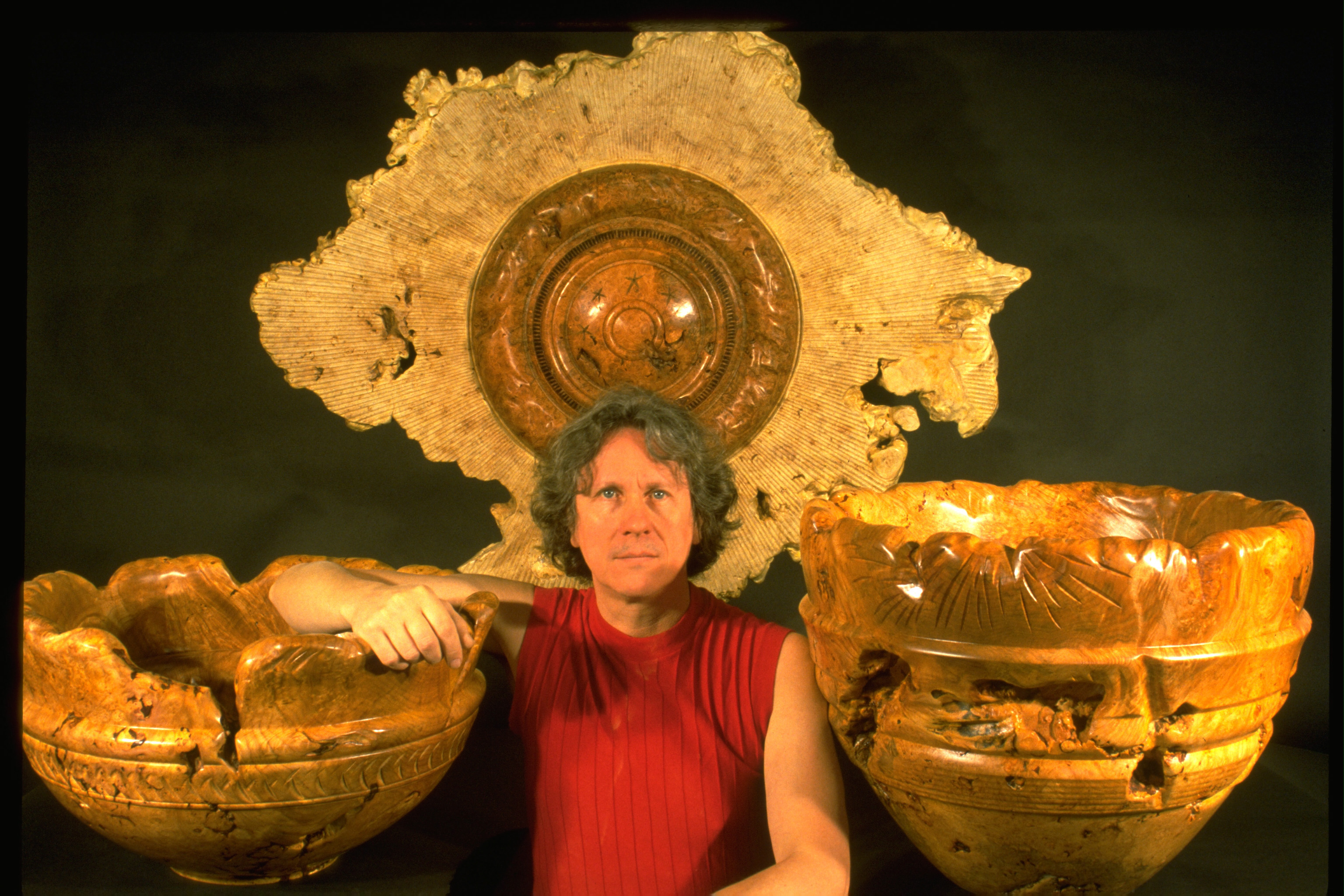
Elliott with Maple Burl Wall Sculpture & Vessels.

In 1974, Elliott toured and played on former Mott the Hoople lead singer Ian Hunter's first solo recording, Ian Hunter. After emigrating to the US in April 1975, he became a US Resident Alien.

He was the original drummer for Foreigner when the band started in 1976. He officially left in January 1993.

After leaving the music industry, Elliott turned to sculpture, working mainly in the medium of wood. Self-taught, many of his works have been vessels made of burlwood, sculpted wall mirrors, wall sculptures, and orbital sculptures.

On 2 June 1990, Elliott and his wife, Iona, were rescued by the US Coast Guard after jumping from their yacht Charisma III, which had caught fire. Elliott became a US citizen in 1993.

On 9 January 2013, he joined Foreigner on stage at the Hard Rock Live in Hollywood, Florida to perform "Hot Blooded". On 12 January 2015, in Sarasota, Florida, Foreigner were joined on stage by original drummer Elliott and former bassist Rick Wills to play "Hot Blooded". Elliott joined his old mates for two songs at Foreigner's show on 2 August 2017, at MidFlorida Credit Union Amphitheater in Tampa, Florida. A pair of '40th Anniversary Reunion Shows’ took place on 6–7 October 2017, at the Soaring Eagle Casino & Resort in Mount Pleasant, Michigan, where the current Foreigner group played one set and the original members consisting of the Head Games-era line-up: Mick Jones, Lou Gramm, Dennis Elliott, Al Greenwood, Ian McDonald and Rick Wills, played the second set and were rejoined at the end with all members. The concerts were filmed for future release.

On 4 August 2018, Elliott again joined a ‘Reunion Show’ at the Buffalo Chip in Sturgis, South Dakota, where the current Foreigner group played one set and the original members played the second and all joined together for the finale.

In 2024, Elliott was inducted into the Rock and Roll Hall of Fame, as a member of Foreigner.

== Discography ==
=== The Shevells ===
- 1968: "Big City Lights"/"The Coffee Song" (single)

=== The Ferris Wheel ===
- 1970: Ferris Wheel (album)
- 1970: "Can't Stop Now"/"I Know You Well" (UK single)
- 1970: "Ugly Duckling"/"I Know You Well" (US single)

=== IF ===
- 1970: If
- 1970: If 2
- 1971: If 3
- 1972: If 4
- 1972: Waterfall
- 1995: Forgotten Roads: The Best of If
- 1997: Europe '72
- 2010: Fibonacci's Number - More Live If
- 2012: If 2 + Live in Liverpool

=== The Roy Young Band ===
- 1973: "Back Up Train" (single)
- 1973: "Devil's Daughter" (single)
- 1973: "Dig a Hole" (single)
- 1973: "If You Could Only See Me Now" (single)
- 2009: The Best of 50 Years (album)

=== Tony Ashton and Jon Lord ===
- 1974: First of the Big Bands

=== Ian Hunter ===
- 1975: Ian Hunter
- 1977: Overnight Angels

=== Foreigner ===
- 1977: Foreigner (#4 US)
- 1978: Double Vision (#3 US, #32 UK)
- 1979: Head Games (#5 US)
- 1981: 4 (#1 US, #5 UK)
- 1982: Records (#10 US, #58 UK)
- 1984: Agent Provocateur (#4 US, #1 UK)
- 1987: Inside Information (#15 US, #64 UK)
- 1991: Unusual Heat
- 1992: The Very Best ... and Beyond (#123 US, #19 UK)
- 1993: Classic Hits Live/Best of Live
- 1994: JukeBox Heroes: The Best Of
- 1998: The Best of Ballads– I Want to Know What Love Is
- 1999: The Platinum Collection
- 2000: Hot Blooded and Other Hits
- 2000: Jukebox Heroes: The Foreigner Anthology
- 2002: Complete Greatest Hits (#80 US)
- 2002: The Definitive (#33 UK)
- 2004: Hot Blooded and Other Hits
- 2005: The Essentials
- 2008: No End in Sight: The Very Best of Foreigner (#132 US)
- 2009: Can't Slow Down (#29 US) Note: A different drummer plays on original material (first disc)
- 2014: The Complete Atlantic Studio Albums 1977-1991

=== Ian Lloyd ===
- 1980: Third Wave Civilization

=== Mick Jones ===
- 1989: "Just Wanna Hold" (single) (#19 US Rock)
- 1989: Mick Jones (album)

== Museum collections ==
- Arkansas Art Center, Decorative Arts Museum - Little Rock, Arkansas
- Art Museum of South Texas, Corpus Christi, TX
- The Charles A. Wustum Museum of Fine Arts - Racine, Wisconsin
- Cincinnati Art Museum, Cincinnati, Ohio
- The Contemporary Museum of Art - Honolulu, Hawaii
- Craft & Folk Art Museum - Los Angeles, California
- The Detroit Institute of Arts - Detroit, Michigan
- Fuller Craft Museum - Brockton, Massachusetts
- The Gregg Museum of Art & Design, NC State University - Raleigh, NC
- Honolulu Museum of Art, Honolulu, HI
- Los Angeles County Museum of Art - Los Angeles, California
- The Mabel Brady Garven Collection, Yale University Art Gallery - New Haven, Connecticut
- The Mint Museum of Craft & Design - Charlotte, North Carolina
- Mobile Museum of Art, (formerly, Fine Arts Museum of the South) - Mobile, Alabama
- Museum of Arts & Design, formerly The American Craft Museum - New York, New York
- Museum of Fine Arts - Boston, Massachusetts
- Peabody Essex Museum, Salem, Massachusetts
- Racine Art Museum, Racine, Wisconsin
- Renwick Gallery of the Smithsonian American Art Museum - Washington, D.C.
- The Slater Museum - Norwich, Connecticut
- University of Michigan Museum of Art - Ann Arbor, Michigan

== Special collections ==
- Columbia Pictures, Star Trek Voyager set - Wall Sculpture - Bleached Maple Burl
