= Double Diamond (album) =

Studio album by If
- Released: July 1973
- Recorded: The Manor Studios
- Genre: Jazz rock; progressive rock
- Length: 41:25
- Label: Brain; Metromedia
- Producer: Lew Futterman

If chronology
Waterfall (1973)	Double Diamond (1973)	Not Just Another Bunch of Pretty Faces (1974)

Double Diamond is the sixth album by British jazz-rock group If and the second to be issued in the U.S. on the Metromedia Records label. With only Dick Morrissey left from the original band, the new line-up featured Fi Trench (keyboards) and Pete Arnesen (keyboards), Steve Rosenthal (guitar/lead vocals), Kurt Palomaki (bass) and Cliff Davies (drums). It was recorded at The Manor recording studios shortly after Mike Oldfield's Tubular Bells, and released in 1973.

In that same year, following the success of the group in Germany, as part of the This is ... series, Brain Records (a division of Metronome) brought out a vinyl LP version of Double Diamond for distribution in Germany only, changing the title to This Is If. The track listing is identical in both cases.

The original cover design, and possibly the title, is a reference to the beer brand of the same name.

== Track listing ==
=== Side one ===
1. "Play, Play, Play" (D. Morrissey, K. Palomaki) – 3:45
2. "Pebbles on the Beach" (D. Morrissey, B. Morrissey) – 4:34
3. "Pick Me Up (And Put Me Back on the Road)" (Davies) – 5:03
4. "Another Time Around (Is Not for Me)" (Davies) – 6:57

=== Side two ===
1. "Groupie Blue (Every Day She's Got the Blues)" (D. Morrissey, T. Preston) – 4:09
2. "Fly, Fly, The Route, Shoot" (Palomaki) – 4:27
3. "Feel Thing Part 1" (Arnesen) – 4:18
4. "Feel Thing Part 2" (Arnesen) – 4:54
5. "Feel Thing Part 3" (Arnesen) – 3:18

== Personnel ==
- Dick Morrissey - tenor and alto saxophones, lead and backing vocals, flute
- Steve Rosenthal - guitar, lead and backing vocals
- Pete Arnesen - piano, backing vocals, organ, synthesizer
- Fi Trench - piano, backing vocals
- Kurt Palomaki - bass, backing vocals
- Cliff Davies - drums, backing vocals, percussion
