= Fiachra Trench =

Irish musician and composer

Fiachra Terence Wilbrah Trench (born 7 September 1941) is an Irish musician and composer from Drogheda, County Louth, Ireland.

Trench was born in Dublin, County Dublin. He first studied chemistry at Trinity College, Dublin, before moving on to the University of Georgia in 1963, and then the University of Cincinnati. From 1969 to 1991, he lived and worked in London. In 1972, he co-produced and played keyboards on the If album Waterfall, as well as appearing on Solid Gold Cadillac's eponymous first album. In 1973, he played piano on the If album Double Diamond.

He and his songwriting partner of the 1980s, Ian Levine, wrote and produced some popular hi-NRG club hits of the era for Miquel Brown, Barbara Pennington and Evelyn Thomas. It was through Levine that he came to co-write the theme tune for the 1981 BBC Doctor Who spin-off K-9 and Company. He is credited with the string arrangements on the Boomtown Rats' "I Don't Like Mondays" and "Fairytale of New York" by the Pogues. Other artists he has worked with include Van Morrison on his 1989 album Avalon Sunset, Elvis Costello, Art Garfunkel, Sinéad O'Connor, the Corrs, Phil Lynott (including the orchestral arrangements on Lynott's solo hit "Old Town"), Sweet (arrangement and piano on early hits), Joan Armatrading and Paul McCartney. His string arrangements on the Van Morrison song, Have I Told You Lately, are among his most beautiful works. He taught McCartney's late wife Linda to play the piano. In 1996, he conducted the French entry in the Eurovision Song Contest, "Diwanit bugale", composed and performed by Dan Ar Braz.

He has scored and composed music for films including Pearl Harbor, The Boxer, The Tailor of Panama and The Ring. In 2006, he reworked Clint Mansell's "Lux Aeterna" for the 2006 AIB Ryder Cup advert "Epic" directed by Enda McCallion.
