= Tea Break Over–Back on Your 'Eads! =

Studio album by If
- Released: 7 March 1975
- Recorded: July & August 1974 at Pyramid Sounds. Mixed at The Hit Factory.
- Genre: Jazz rock; progressive rock
- Length: 38:58
- Label: Capitol Records (US); Gull (UK); Brain (Germany)
- Producer: Jon Child, Cliff Davies, Lew Futterman

If chronology
| Not Just Another Bunch of Pretty Faces (1974) | Tea Break Over–Back on Your 'Eads! (1975) | Forgotten Roads: The Best of If (1995) |

Tea Break Over–Back on Your 'Eads! is the eighth studio album by British jazz-rock band If. Released on 7 March 1975, it was their final studio album for over 40 years, until the release of If 5 in 2016 following their reunion. Tea Break Over was followed in 1995 by a compilation CD covering tracks from the first three LPs featuring the band's previous line-up.

The album reflects the band's more rock-influenced style, perfectly balanced with Dick Morrissey's harsher hard bop/bebop sax playing. The title track "Tea Break", referring to the hardships of being "on the road", is the punch line to an old musicians' joke and contains a tribute to Charlie Parker in the lyrics ("The Bird was the man to be heard" and "The music was the word") as well as in a swirling bebop tenor solo. The "Ballad of the Yessirom Kid", a tribute by the band to Dick Morrissey, finishes with a roaring bebop tenor solo. "Song for Alison" features the flute more than holding its own with a rock accompaniment. The song "Don Quixote" opens with an extensive acoustic Spanish guitar solo by Whitehorn.

== Track listing ==
(LP version - the CD re-release varies the order slightly)

=== Side one ===
1. "Merlin the Magic Man" (Davies) – 5:05
2. "Ballad of the Yessirrom Kid" (Davies) – 5:20
3. "Don Quixote's Masquerade" (Davies) – 7:50

=== Side two ===
1. "Tea Break Over, Back on Your 'Eads" (Whitehorn, Davies, Monaghan) – 6:05
2. "Song for Alison" (Morrissey) – 3:55
3. "I Had a Friend" (Davies) – 4:30
4. "Raw Sewage" (Davies) – 6:13

== Personnel ==
- Geoff Whitehorn – electric and acoustic guitars, vocals
- Dick Morrissey – electric & acoustic tenor, alto and soprano saxophones, flute
- Gabriel Magno – Hammond organ, acoustic and electric piano
- Walt Monaghan – bass, vocals
- Cliff Davies – drums, vibraphone, synthesizer, vocals

Guest:

- Carlos Martinez – percussion
