= Jackie Dougan =

British jazz drummer

Jackie Dougan (1930, Greenock, Scotland – 27 January 1973, New South Wales, Australia) was a British jazz drummer.

Dougan originally played in Scotland with Duncan Lamont's band among others, before moving to London in 1956 to work with Buddy Featherstonhaugh. A member of Tommy Whittle's and Eddie Thompson's groups later that decade, he joined the Dick Morrissey Quartet in the early 1960s. Following on from that he became a member of the Ronnie Scott Quartet, along with another early Dick Morrissey Quartet member, Malcolm Cecil.

After his stint with Scott, Dougan joined the Tony Coe Quintet and later recorded with Stan Tracey (on the Jazz Suite Inspired by Dylan Thomas's "Under Milk Wood" album, 1965), Sonny Stitt, Ben Webster, Al Cohn and Zoot Sims.

In June 1968 Dougan emigrated to Australia, where he worked with Lew Campbell, Don Burrows and others, as well as undertaking a lot of freelance work. He died in a car accident in New South Wales in early 1973.

== Discography ==
- 1962: Zoot at Ronnie Scott's – Zoot Sims
- 1962: Solo for Zoot – Zoot Sims
- 1963: Have You Heard? – The Dick Morrissey Quartet
- 1965: Jazz Suite Inspired by Dylan Thomas's "Under Milk Wood" – Stan Tracey
- 1965: Al and Zoot in London – Al Cohn & Zoot Sims
