= Not Just Another Bunch of Pretty Faces =

Studio album by If
- Released: October 1974
- Recorded: October 1973 – February 1974 at: Sleepy Hollow Recording, Ithaca, N.Y. Majestic Sound, London, England. The Sound Pit, Atlanta, GA. Allen-Martin Studios, Louisville, KY.
- Genre: Jazz rock; progressive rock
- Length: 36:06
- Label: Capitol (US); Gull (UK); Brain Records (Germany)
- Producer: Lew Futterman, assisted by Jon Child and Cliff Davies

If chronology
Double Diamond (1973)	Not Just Another Bunch of Pretty Faces (1974)	Tea Break Over–Back on Your 'Eads! (1975)

Professional ratings
Review scores
Source	Rating
Allmusic	3/5 stars

Not Just Another Bunch of Pretty Faces is the seventh studio album by British jazz-rock band If, released in 1974.

The band was now back on Capitol Records for U.S. distribution.

== Track listing ==
=== Side one ===
1. "In the Winter of Your Life" – 4:59 (Geoff Whitehorn, Cliff Davies)
2. "Stormy Every Weekday Blues" – 6:07 (Davies)
3. "Follow That with Your Performing Seals" – 5:51 (Dick Morrissey)

=== Side two ===
4. "Still Alive" – 4:29 (Morrissey, Brigitta Morrissey)
5. "Borrowed Time" – 4:30 (Davies)
6. "Chiswick High Road Blues" – 5:17 (Davies)
7. "I Believe in Rock & Roll" – 4:53 (Whitehorn, Davies, Walt Monaghan)

== Personnel ==
- Dick Morrissey – saxes and flute, lead vocals (4)
- Geoff Whitehorn – electric and acoustic guitars, lead (1, 7) and backing vocals
- Gabriel Magno – Hammond organ, electric and acoustic pianos, electric harpsichord
- Walt Monaghan – bass (all but 1), lead (5, 7) and backing vocals
- Cliff Davies – drums, lead vocals (2, 6), congas, vibes
- Mike Tomich – bass (1)
