= Spike Robinson =

American jazz saxophonist

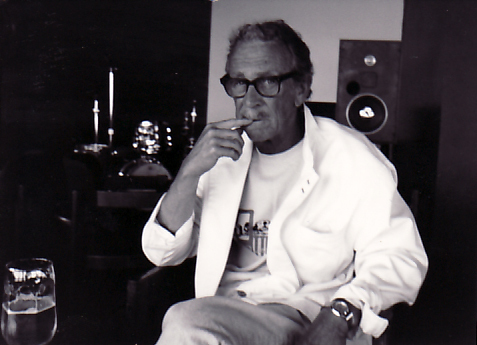
- Photo by Fraser MacPherson

Background information
- Born: Henry Bertholf Robinson; January 16, 1930; Kenosha, Wisconsin
- Died: October 29, 2001 (aged 71) Writtle, England
- Genres: Jazz
- Occupation: Musician
- Instrument: Tenor saxophone
- Labels: Discovery, Hep, Concord

Henry Bertholf "Spike" Robinson (January 16, 1930 – October 29, 2001) was an American jazz tenor saxophonist. He began playing at age twelve, recording on several labels, including Discovery, Hep and Concord. However, he sought an engineering degree and followed that profession for nearly 30 years. In 1981 he returned to recording music.

== Early life ==
Robinson was born in Kenosha, Wisconsin on January 16, 1930. Beginning on alto saxophone in his early years, Robinson soon discovered that it was hard to make a living playing the kind of music he wanted to play.

== Later life and career ==
In 1948, Robinson joined the US Navy as a musician and by 1950 was based in the UK. He was soon regularly jamming at London's Club Eleven, Downbeat Club and Studio 51 with leading UK beboppers, including Tommy Pollard, Johnny Dankworth and Victor Feldman. He made a few records for Carlo Krahmer's Esquire label but eventually was transferred home and demobilized. Unhappy with the music scene in the Chicago area, he took advantage of the G.I. Bill to study electronic engineering at university.

For most of the next three decades he lived and worked in Colorado, eventually taking up music by playing tenor saxophone at local clubs. A constant musical companion of these times was Dave Grusin. In 1981, Robinson recorded with the pianist Victor Feldman and bassist Ray Brown for the album was Spike Robinson Plays Harry Warren. Encouraged to visit the UK by a British fan, in 1984 Robinson began a series of tours there. These were successful and Robinson took early retirement from his engineering job. He then played alongside British jazzmen including Dick Morrissey, pianist Bill Le Sage, bassist Alec Dankworth and drummer Bill Eyden, among others.

In the 1980s and early 1990s, he performed at clubs and festivals throughout the UK, Europe and in the US. In the latter he made his New York debut at Christmas 1990. He recorded a string of well received albums, mainly in the role of bandleader but also supporting Louis Stewart, Harry Edison, Al Cohn, Roy Williams and Claude Tissendier. By the early 1990s, Robinson was touring from his UK base, recording albums and headlining at clubs and festivals across Europe and the US. He moved permanently to England in 1989.

He formed the band "Young Lions, Old Tigers" alongside UK Saxophonist Derek Nash, drummer Pete Cater, bassist Rob Rickenberg and pianist Nick Weldon, releasing an album of the same name on Jazzizit Records in 2000. This album went on to win Jazz CD of the Year in the British Jazz Awards.

He died in Writtle, Essex, on October 29, 2001.

== Playing style ==
"Robinson's playing was characterised by a mellow tone, unaggressive approach and a deep affinity with the classic American song. Broadly speaking, he was one of that school of tenor saxophonists who followed in the wake of Lester Young, players such as Stan Getz and Zoot Sims, but he had developed his own highly engaging voice within that style."

== Discography ==
- At Chesters Volume 1 (Hep, 1984)
- At Chesters Volume 2 (Hep, 1984)
- The Gershwin Collection (Hep, 1987)
- Live at the Bull – Tribute Vols. 1–2 (Bull's Head Music, 1987–88)
- Three for the Road (Hep, 1989)
- Claude Tissendier/Saxomania Presenting Spike Robinson (Omd, 1989)
- Stairway to the Stars (Hep, 1990)
- Spike Robinson and George Masso Play Arlen (Hep, 1991)
- Plays Harry Warren (Hep, 1981–93)
- The CTS Session (Hep, 1998)
- Young Lions Old Tigers (Jazzizit, 2000)
- I Wish I Knew - Live in Dublin 1979. The Ralph O'Callaghan Collection. 2007 Nagel Heyer Records
