= Don't Get Around Much Anymore – Live at Bullerbyn =

1975 Swedish Jazz recording

Don't Get Around Much Anymore - Live at Bullerbyn

Live album by Rolf Ericson Dick Morrissey Tommy Körberg Terry Smith Berndt Egerbladh Sture Nordin Rune Carlsson
- Released: 1975
- Recorded: 25 & 26 August 1975
- Genre: Jazz
- Label: Polydor Grammofonverket – EFG-5015127

Don't Get Around Much Anymore – Live at Bullerbyn is a live 1975 jazz recording of a two-evening jam session at the Bullerbyn jazz club, Stockholm, Sweden. It features two Duke Ellington compositions, including the title track, in tribute to earlier Stockholm recordings by Ben Webster and Rolf Ericson, both of whom had been members of the Ellington Orchestra.

== Track listing ==
1. "Hallelujah (I Love Her So)" (Ray Charles)
2. "Don't Get Around Much Anymore" (Duke Ellington, Bob Russell)
3. "As Time Goes By" (Herman Hupfeld)
4. "In a Mellow Tone" (Duke Ellington, Milt Gabler)
5. "What's New?" (Bob Haggart)
6. "Sunny" (Bobby Hebb)

== Personnel ==
- Rolf "Roffe" Ericson - trumpet
- Dick Morrissey - tenor saxophone
- Berndt Egerbladh - piano
- Terry Smith - guitar
- Sture Nordin - double bass
- Rune Carlsson - drums
- Tommy Körberg - vocals
