= In Hoagland =

Studio album by Georgie Fame, Annie Ross and Hoagy Carmichael
- Released: June 1981
- Studio: Trident Studios, London
- Genre: Jazz
- Label: Baldeagle BELP 181
- Producer: Georgie Fame, John Lambe, Rod Slade

In Hoagland is an album by Georgie Fame, Annie Ross and Hoagy Carmichael, featuring a band of leading UK jazz musicians and arrangements by Harry South. Originally released under the title In Hoagland '81, it was recorded in London and released in June 1981, just a few months before Carmichael died in December of that year.

== Track listing ==
All tracks composed by Hoagy Carmichael; except where indicated

1. "The Old Music Master" (Carmichael, Johnny Mercer)
2. "Hong Kong Blues"
3. "Georgia on My Mind" (Carmichael, Stuart Gorrell)
4. "One Morning in May"
5. "My Resistance Is Low" (Carmichael, Harold Adamson)
6. I Get Along Without You Very Well"
7. "Rockin' Chair"
8. "Drip Drop"
9. "Stardust" (Carmichael, Mitchell Parish)
10. "Up a Lazy River" (Carmichael, Sidney Arodin)
11. "Two Sleepy People" (Carmichael, Frank Loesser)
12. "Hoagy's Help" (Spoken)
13. "Hoagland"

== Personnel ==
- Georgie Fame - keyboards, vocals, producer, arranger
- Annie Ross – vocals
- Hoagy Carmichael - piano, vocals
- Harry South – arranger
- Barry Morgan - drums
- Chris Pyne - trombone
- Daryl Runswick - bass
- Dick Morrissey - tenor saxophone, flute
- Jim Richardson - bass
- Geoff Castle - synthesizer, keyboards
- Ian Hamer - trumpet
- Martin Kershaw - guitar
- Peter King - alto saxophone

Technical

- Steve Short, Dai Reynolds, Terry Evennett - engineer
