= Live at the Bull – Tribute Vols. 1–2 =

Live at the Bull - Tribute Vols. 1-2

Live album by Dick Morrissey Spike Robinson
- Released: 2007
- Recorded: 1987/8
- Genre: Jazz
- Label: Bull's Head Music

Live at the Bull – Tribute Vols. 1–2 is a 2-CD tribute album released in 2007 featuring tenor saxophonists Dick Morrissey and Spike Robinson accompanied by Bill Le Sage, Bill Eyden, Alec Dankworth, John Pearce, and Simon Morton. It was recorded live at the Bull's Head, Barnes in 1987 and 1988.

== Volume 1 ==
=== Track listing ===
1. "Broadway" - (Gerry Mulligan)
2. "The Gypsy" - (Billy Reid)
3. "In a Mellow Tone" - (Duke Ellington)
4. "Close Enough for Love" - (Johnny Mandel, Paul Williams)
5. "Gee, Baby, Ain't I Good to You" - (Don Redman)
6. "Tickle Toe" - (Lester Young)

=== Personnel ===
- Dick Morrissey - tenor saxophone
- Spike Robinson - tenor saxophone
- Bill Le Sage - piano
- Alec Dankworth - double bass
- Bill Eyden - drums

== Volume 2 ==
=== Track listing ===
1. "Strike Up the Band" - (George Gershwin, Ira Gershwin)
2. "Time After Time" - (Sammy Cahn, Jule Styne)
3. Announcement - by Spike Robinson
4. "Stompin' at the Savoy" - (Benny Goodman, Chick Webb)
5. "I Can't Get Started" - (Vernon Duke)
6. "Blues Up and Down" - (Gene Ammons)
7. "Goodbye" - (Gordon Jenkins)

=== Personnel ===
- Dick Morrissey - tenor saxophone
- Spike Robinson - tenor saxophone
- John Pearce - piano
- Alec Dankworth - double bass
- Simon Morton - drums
