= Dave Quincy =

English musician

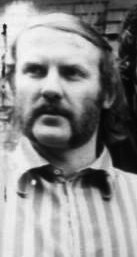
- Quincy in 1970

Background information
- Born: 13 September 1939 (age 86); Battle, Sussex, England
- Genres: Jazz; jazz fusion
- Instruments: Saxophone, flute
- Years active: 1962–present
- Formerly of: The Thunderbirds, Manfred Mann Chapter Three, If, Zzebra

David Quincy (born 13 September 1939, Battle, Sussex), also billed as Dave Quincey, is an English saxophonist and composer who was a founder-member of British jazz-rock bands If and Zzebra.

== Career ==
Quincy's professional career began in the early 1960s, when he backed Jet Harris, who went solo after leaving The Shadows. His first tour with Harris was in 1962, with Sam Cooke and Little Richard.

He then joined Geraldo's Navy and performed on the MS Queen Elizabeth for a while before he returned to land and toured with Chris Farlowe and the Thunderbirds from August 1965 to February 1967. Quincy claims that nor he or the other band members ever played on Farlowe's recordings, including his 1966 number one "Out of Time", with session musicians being brought in instead. In the Thunderbirds with Quincy at the time included Dave Greenslade and Albert Lee. Quincy left the Thunderbirds in 1967 when he started focusing more on jazz music.

Quincy then recorded two albums with Manfred Mann Chapter Three before recording for JJ Jackson, where he met up with Dick Morrissey and Terry Smith, with whom he would form If. Quincy toured with If for four years, when he and Smith left in 1973 to form Zzebra. Zzebra released three albums between 1974 and 1975, with Quincy playing saxophones, clavinet and piano amongst them. In 1974, he produced the music for the comedy film Can You Keep It Up for a Week?.

In 2014 the album Groovicity, a recent recording by a quartet led by Quincy, was released. In 2016, the label released If 5, being a record by a reformed version of If, led by Quincy and Smith.

== Personal life ==
Quincy fell ill with cancer in 2014, but soon recovered.

== Discography ==
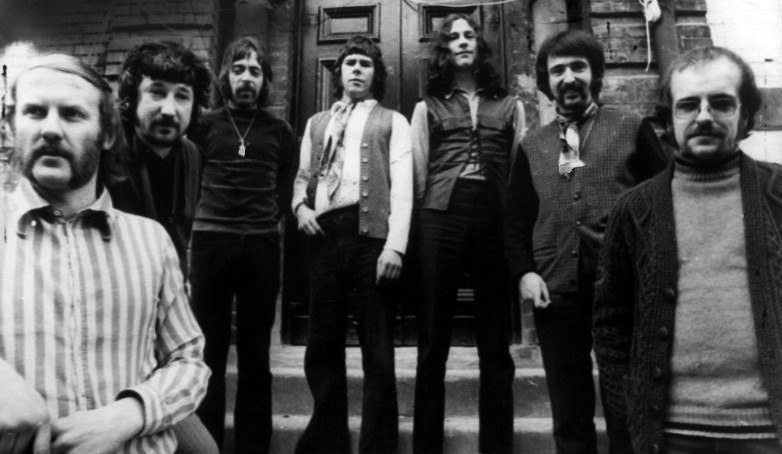
Quincy (far left) as part of the band If in 1970

=== With Manfred Mann ===
- 1969: Chapter Three - Manfred Mann's Chapter Three
- 1970: Chapter Three Vol. 2 - Manfred Mann's Chapter Three

=== With If ===
- 1970:If
- 1970:If 2
- 1971:If 3
- 1972:If 4
- 1972:Waterfall
- 2016:If 5 (Repertoire)
- 2022* IF live at the BBC

=== With Zzebra ===
- 1974: Zzebra
- 1975: Panic (Polydor)
- 1975: Take It Or Leave It
- 2001: Lost World (recorded live in 1975)

=== As sideman ===
- 1970: J. J. Jackson's Dilemma
- 1971: Cast of Thousands - Leigh Stephens
- 1982: In London - Teresa Brewer
- 1986: Altitude - Jamie Talbot

=== Solo ===
- 1974: Can You Keep It Up for a Week? (film score)

=== With Groovicity ===
- 2014: Groovicity (Dave Quincy/Guy Gardner Quartet) (Repertoire Records)
