= Ronnie Stephenson =

English jazz drummer (1937–2002)

- Born: Ronald Stephenson; 26 January 1937; Sunderland, UK
- Died: 8 August 2002 (aged 65) Dundee, Scotland
- Genres: Jazz
- Occupation: Musician
- Instrument: Drums
- Years active: 1951-1995

Ronnie Stephenson (26 January 1937 – 8 August 2002) was an English jazz drummer. He was one of the most in-demand drummers on the British jazz scene in the 1960s.

== Biography ==
Stephenson was born in Sunderland. As a boy, he wanted to become a tap dancer like his idol Gene Kelly, but he was persuaded by his father and his brother to take up the drums. Ronnie was given a second-hand drum kit when he was 14 and, a year later, aged 15, he was playing with semi-professional bands near his home. His elder brother Billy played the piano, and his brother Bob also became a pianist, but Ronnie was focussed on playing the drums. He already played his first gig in public in the same week as he took his first drum lesson at the age of 14 and was soon working with pianist elder brother Bob's band, and then with the Ray Chester's Sextet. He went to Birmingham to join the Cliff Deeley Band at the Tower Ballroom, where he played for several months before going on the road. When he was 16, he joined the singer Lita Roza, a national star who had left the Ted Heath band to tour the variety theatre circuit as a soloist. The 10 months he spent with her was to be of great experience in the music business.

He was conscripted into the Army and served in The Royal Signals Band. He was demobbed in 1957. Stephenson had a close association with Ronnie Scott and the Club and, being the resident house drummer, he spent two years (1964–1966) in Ronnie Scott's Quartet, and accompanied many visiting stars. In July, 1966, he formed a Big Band called 'The Ronnie Stephenson Big Band' and recorded a 'Drum Spectacular' LP on Columbia Records with drummer Kenny Clare. He toured Germany with Tom Jones in 1969 and then took up the resident drum chair with the Kurt Edelhagen Band after moving to Cologne with his wife Jean, daughter Kim, and son Carl. After three years with the Edelhagen band, he teamed up with pianist Paul Kuhn in Berlin and toured Europe with bands and artists including the 'Radio Free Berlin Big Band'. This was at the time when Carmell Jones, Milo Pavlovic, Heinz von Hermann, Torolf Molgaard and Eugen Cicero were all members of the band. He joined the Theater des Westens orchestra in Berlin in 1981, and remained there until his retirement on health grounds in 1995. He also taught at the University of Berlin from 1990 to 1993.

He performed or recorded with Sonny Rollins, Stan Getz, Wes Montgomery, Zoot Sims, Quincy Jones, Paul Gonsalves, Johnny Griffin, Roland Kirk, Gerry Mulligan, Sonny Stitt, Barney Kessel, Benny Golson, Benny Goodman, Nelson Riddle, Ella Fitzgerald, Mel Tormé, Tony Bennett, Ronnie Ross, Stan Tracey, Ted Heath, Dick Morrissey, Terry Smith, Jack Parnell, John Dankworth, Tubby Hayes, Cleo Laine, Kurt Edelhagen, Peter Herbolzheimer, Horst Jankowski, Rolf Kühn, Kenny Clarke, and Victor Feldman, among many others.

In addition to his many jazz connections, he also played with pop stars such as Tom Jones, Matt Monro, Engelbert Humperdinck, Cilla Black and Shirley Bassey.

He also played on the Bond themes Diamonds Are Forever and You Only Live Twice and on other film scores, including Chitty Chitty Bang Bang. In the 1990s, Stephenson played with Peter Herbolzheimer's Rhythm Combination & Brass, particularly the Berghausen Jazz Festival and the Domicile in Munich. He set a very high standard of playing wherever he played.

== Personal life and death ==
In 1995, Stephenson retired from music on medical advice and settled in Alyth, Perthshire, Scotland with his wife Jean to be near his daughter, Kim. He turned to golf as a restorative, becoming a member of Strathmore Golf Club.

He died in Dundee, Scotland on 8 August 2002, aged 65. He is survived by his wife, children, Kim and Carl, five grandchildren and a great-grandchild.

== Select discography ==
- 1958: Stan Getz and the Big Band of Europe
- 1960: Stan Getz with Kurt Edelhagen Orchestra
- 1962: Mike Carr's EmCee Five – Bebop from the East Coast
- 1964: Paul Gonsalves – Boom-Jackie-Boom-Chick
- 1964: Ronnie Scott and Sonny Stitt – The Night Has A Thousand Eyes (Live At Ronnie Scott's)
- 1965: Paul Gonsalves – Just Friends
- 1965: Ronnie Scott Trio – Double Event
- 1965: Wes Montgomery – Live In Europe
- 1965: Wes Montgomery – Live at Ronnie Scott's
- 1965: Benny Golson with Stan Tracey – Three Little Words
- 1965: Stan Tracey – Laughin' And Scratchin'
- 1965: "Humphrey Lyttelton And His Band"
- 1966: Stan Tracey Big Band – Alice in Jazz Land
- 1966: Kenny Clare & Ronnie Stephenson – Drum Spectacular
- 1966: The Stan Tracey Big Band
- 1967: Stan Tracey Quartet – With Love from Jazz
- 1968: Ronnie Ross – Cleopatra's Needle
- 1969: J.J. Jackson – The Greatest Little Soul Band in the Land
- 1969: Terry Smith – Fall Out
- 1978: Rolf Ericson/Johnny Griffin – Sincerely Ours
