= Keith Christie =

- Birth name: Keith Ronald Christie
- Born: 6 January 1931; Blackpool, England
- Died: 16 December 1980 (aged 49); London, England
- Genres: Jazz
- Occupation: Musician
- Instrument: Trombone

Keith Ronald Christie (6 January 1931 – 16 December 1980) was an English jazz trombonist. He was the brother of Ian Christie.

== Career ==
Christie began playing at age 14 and attended the Guildhall School of Music and Drama. He formed a band with his brother in the late 1940s, and soon after the pair joined the band of Humphrey Lyttelton. Christie served in the military early in the 1950s, then reconvened to lead an ensemble with his brother, the Christie Brothers' Stompers, featuring Ken Colyer and Dicky Hawdon. In 1953 the group broke up, and Christie went on to work with John Dankworth, Cleo Laine, George Chisholm, Harry Klein, Kenny Baker, Vic Ash, Wally Fawkes, and Tommy Whittle.

Christie was a member of the trombone section of the Ted Heath Orchestra from 1957 until the late 1960s, playing alongside Don Lusher. He also played with drummer Allan Ganley, saxophonists Ronnie Ross and Art Ellefson from 1959 to 1962 in the Jazzmakers. He toured the U.S. with Vic Lewis in 1960. After a brief reunion with Heath he played with Jimmy Deuchar (1964) and Harry South (1965–66). In 1970–71 he joined Benny Goodman on a tour of Europe. During the 1960s and 1970s, he played with Tubby Hayes, Paul Gonsalves, Ian Hamer, Stan Tracey, Kenny Wheeler, Bobby Lamb and Ray Premru, Phil Seamen, and Tony Kinsey.

In the mid-1970s he suffered a fall and recovered, but continuing battles with alcoholism resulted in his death in December 1980, at the age of 49.

== Discography ==
=== As sideman ===
With Tubby Hayes

- Tubbs (Fontana, 1961)
- Tubbs' Tours (Fontana, 1964)
- 100% Proof (Fontana, 1967)

With Ted Heath

- The World of Big Band Blues (London, 1959)
- Ted Heath Swing Session (Decca, 1959)
- My Very Good Friends the Bandleaders (Decca, 1960)
- Big Band Spirituals (Decca, 1963)
- Swing vs. Latin (Decca, 1963)
- All Time Top Twelve (Decca, 1973)
- The Ted Heath Band in Concert (Decca, 1977)

With others

- Sidney Bechet, We Dig Dixieland Jazz (Musidisc, 1965)
- Kenny Clare & Ronnie Stephenson, Drum Spectacular (Columbia, 1967)
- Mike d'Abo, Down at Rachel's Place (A&M, 1972)
- Georgie Fame, Sound Venture (Columbia, 1966)
- Georgie Fame, The Two Faces of Fame (CBS, 1967)
- Sam Fonteyn, Big Band Spectacular (Columbia, 1966)
- Paul Gonsalves & Tubby Hayes, Just Friends (Columbia, 1965)
- Benny Goodman, Benny Goodman in Concert (Decca, 1971)
- Johnny Keating, Swing Revisited (Decca, 1963)
- Dave Lee, Jazz Improvisations of Our Man Crichton (Colpix, 1965)
- Vic Lewis, Big Band Explosion (Ember, 1964)
- Bill McGuffie, The Bill McGuffie Big Band (Rediffusion, 1972)
- Steve Race, Take One (World Record Club, 1965)
- William Russo, Russo in London (Columbia, 1963)
- Stan Tracey, The Latin-American Caper (Columbia, 1969)
- Stan Tracey, We Love You Madly (Columbia, 1969)
- Andrew Lloyd Webber & Tim Rice, Jesus Christ Superstar (MCA, 1970)
- Kenny Wheeler, Song for Someone (Incus, 1973)

== Bibliography ==
- Henley/Kernfeld, "Keith Christie". Grove Jazz online.
