= Ian Hamer (musician) =

British jazz trumpeter (1932–2006)

- Born: Ian Wilfred Hamer; 11 September 1932; Liverpool, England
- Died: 3 September 2006 (aged 73) Brighton, East Sussex, England
- Genres: Jazz
- Instrument: Trumpet
- Years active: 1953–2006

Ian Wilfred Hamer (11 September 1932 – 3 September 2006) was a British jazz trumpeter.

== Early life ==
Hamer was born in Liverpool, the son of a successful Merseyside dance band leader. Together with his two brothers, also professional musicians, he played in the band run by his mother until serving in the Royal Air Force.

== Music career ==
In 1953, Hamer moved to London to work for clarinettist Carl Barriteau and a brief period with the Oscar Rabin Band. From 1955 to 1956, he was part of the Tubby Hayes octet. He later joined the Vic Ash quintet.

In 1963, together with Harry South, he led a band called The Six Sounds, featuring Ken Wray and Dick Morrissey, and which by 1966 had developed into his own band, the Ian Hamer Sextet. The Sextet featured variously South, Dick Morrissey, Keith Christie, Kenny Napper, Bill Eyden, Tubby Hayes, Alan Skidmore, Spike Wells, Daryl Runswick, Alan Branscombe and Ron Mathewson. Also in 1966, Hamer joined the Top of the Pops studio orchestra conducted by Johnny Pearson.

Hamer also played in big bands led by Tubby Hayes, Ted Heath, Mike Gibbs, Jack Parnell and Harry South. He also played with Kenny Wheeler, Dizzy Gillespie, Ella Fitzgerald, as well as smaller bands with Stan Tracey, Benny Golson, Lalo Schifrin, Gary McFarland, Woody Herman's Anglo-American Herd, Barbara Thompson, the Thad Jones-Mel Lewis band, Eric Delaney, John Dankworth and Joe Harriott. As a session musician, he played on recordings by The Beatles ("Got to Get You into My Life" ) and Bing Crosby, Tom Jones, Dusty Springfield, Shirley Bassey, Barbra Streisand, James Last, Matt Monro, and Peter Herbolzheimer.

He played trumpet on the theme tune for The Sweeney, written and arranged by Harry South.

In 1987, Hamer moved to Brighton and founded the group Ian Hamer and the Sussex Youth Jazz Orchestra (later dropping "Youth").

== Personal life ==
Hamer was first married to Veronica Spinks in 1957. They had three children before their marriage was dissolved. He married Marion Stedman in 1988. On 3 September 2006, Hamer died in Brighton aged 73.

== Discography ==
=== As sideman ===
With Georgie Fame

- Sound Venture (Columbia, 1966)
- The Two Faces of Fame (CBS, 1967)
- The Third Face of Fame (CBS, 1967)
- In Hoagland 1981 with Annie Ross (Bald Eagle 1981)

With Michael Gibbs

- Michael Gibbs (Deram, 1970)
- Directs the Only Chrome Waterfall Orchestra (Ah Um, 1991)

With Tubby Hayes

- 100% Proof (Fontana, 1967)
- Tubbs' Tours (Mole Jazz 1981)
- England's Late Jazz Great (IAJRC 1987)
- 200% Proof (Master Mix 1992)

With Kenny Wheeler

- Song for Someone (Incus, 1973)
- Music for Large & Small Ensembles (ECM, 1990)
- A Long Time Ago (ECM, 1999)

With others

- Lionel Bart, Isn't This Where We Came In? (Deram, 1968)
- Ginger Baker, Eleven Sides (Baker Mountain 1977)
- Miquel Brown, Symphony Love (Polydor, 1978)
- Joe Gallivan, London (Compendium, 1976)
- John Mayer, Etudes (Sonet, 1969)
- Gary Shearston, The Greatest Stone on Earth and Other Two-Bob Wonders (Charisma 1975)
- Barbara Thompson, Barbara Thompson's Jubiaba (MCA, 1978)
- Andrew Lloyd Webber & Tim Rice, Jesus Christ Superstar (MCA, 1970)
- Phil Woods, I Remember (Gryphon, 1979)
