= Daryl Runswick =

English jazz musician and composer (born 1946)

- Born: 12 October 1946 (age 79); Leicester, England
- Education: Wyggeston Grammar School for Boys; Corpus Christi College, Cambridge
- Occupations: Composer, arranger, jazz musician, producer and educationalist
- Website: www.darylrunswick.net

Daryl Runswick (born 12 October 1946) is a classically trained English composer, arranger, jazz musician, producer and educationalist.

== Career ==
Born in Leicester, Runswick was educated at Wyggeston Grammar School for Boys and Corpus Christi College, Cambridge. He started playing bass with leading UK jazz musicians in the mid-1960s, including Dick Morrissey and John Dankworth, with whom he would tour and compose for extensively for some 12 years. In 1969, Runswick was a member of the Lionel Grigson–Pete Burden Quintet, and in 1972 played and recorded with the Ian Hamer Septet, a band in which Runswick coincided with Tubby Hayes, among others, and throughout the 1970s he was also a member of the London Jazz Four. As a session musician, Runswick later branched out into more popular music, including appearing on the first The Alan Parsons Project recording and working with Elton John.

Runswick has also worked with the London Sinfonietta, Nash Ensemble and The King's Singers, Pierre Boulez, Ornette Coleman, Simon Rattle and Sarah Vaughan.

Singer Cleo Laine recorded several of his compositions.

From 1983 to 1998, Runswick was the tenor singer and resident composer in the avant-garde electronic vocal group Electric Phoenix, performing worldwide and working with, among others, composers Luciano Berio, Pierre Boulez, John Cage and Henri Pousseur.

From 1995 to 2005, Runswick was Head of Composition Faculty at Trinity College of Music (notable students include Angie Atmadjaja, Dai Fujikura, Harris Kittos, Nikos Veliotis and Reynaldo Young).

As a composer, Runswick has written film and TV scores, including the films Gullsandur (Golden Sands) (1985) and No Surrender (1985), and the TV series Brond (1987) with Bill Nelson, The Advocates (1991–92) and Seekers (1993). His major concert work, Maybe I Can Have an Everlasting Love, for voice, computer-generated electronics and orchestra, premiered in 2005 at Blackheath Halls, London. His works have also been conducted by Jeffrey Skidmore and played by the BBC Symphony Orchestra, among other performers.

As a record producer, Runswick has produced recordings by Keith Tippett.

Runswick is the author of a standard textbook Rock, Jazz and Pop Arranging.

== Discography ==
- The Johnstons (1968)
- Atlantic Bridge (1970)
- That's Just the Way I Want to Be (1970) [Blossom Dearie]
- Rites and Rituals (1970) [Ray Russell]
- Rock Workshop (1971) [Ray Russell]
- The Very Last Time (1971) [Ray Russell]
- From the Beggar's Mantle (1971) [Barbara Dickson]
- Live at the ICA (1972) [Ray Russell]
- Acropolis (1972) [Ian Hamer Septet] (released 2005)
- Secret Asylum (1973) [Ray Russell]
- Tales of Mystery and Imagination (1976) [The Alan Parsons Project]
- Alan Branscombe & Tony Coe (1977)
- In Hoagland – Georgie Fame (1981) [Annie Ross and Hoagy Carmichael]
- "Secret Ceremony (Theme From Brond)" / "Wiping A Tear From The All Seeing Eye", 7" & 12" single versions (1987) [Scala Featuring Bill Nelson & Daryl Runswick] Cocteau
- My Family and Other Animals (1987)
