= Dave Wintour =

English bass guitarist (1944–2022)

- Born: David M. Wintour; 1 September 1944; Forest of Dean, Gloucestershire, England
- Died: Drumnacross, Kilraine, County Donegal, Ireland 12 July 2022 (aged 77)
- Occupations: Bassist; session musician
- Instrument: Bass guitar

David M. Wintour (1 September 1944 – 12 July 2022) was an English bass guitarist and session musician. Wintour is best known for his active part as a member of The Wurzels from 1995 to 2002.

== Life and career ==
Wintour was born on 1 September 1944 in Forest of Dean, Gloucestershire.

He played and recorded with artists such as Rick Wakeman, Eric Carmen, Pete Atkin, Kenny Young, the pioneer jazz-rock band If, Clifford T. Ward, Roger Daltrey, Slapp Happy, Steve Swindells, Pretty Things, Stealers Wheel, Russ Ballard and Leo Sayer.

He played bass on the 1975 Rocky Horror Picture Show soundtrack.

Wintour died from cancer on 12 July 2022, at the age of 77 in his home in Drumnacross, Kilraine in County Donegal, Ireland.
