= Terry Smith (guitarist) =

British jazz guitarist (born 1943)

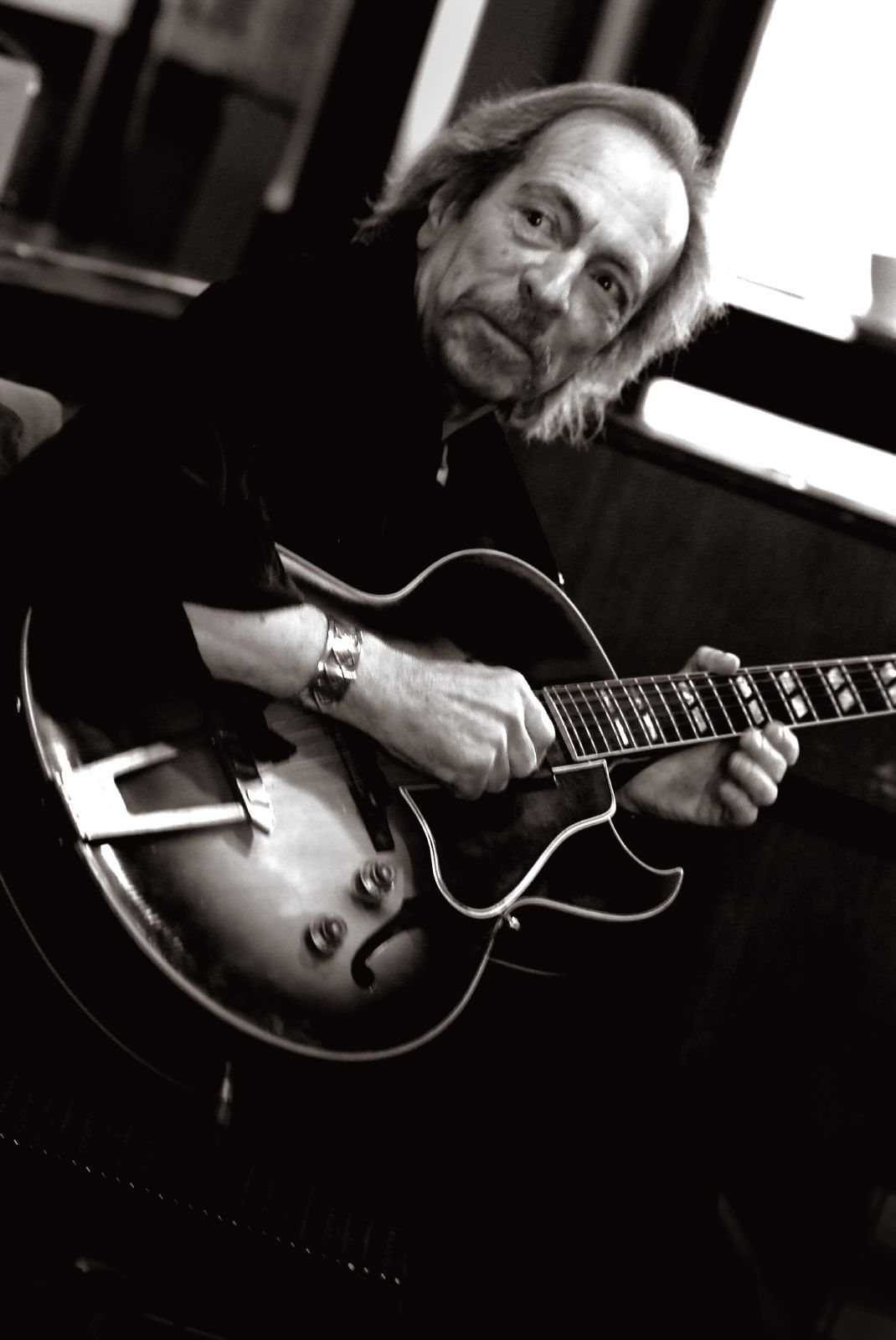

Background information
- Born: Terence Smith; 20 May 1943 (age 83); West Norwood, South-East London, England
- Genres: Jazz; pop; rock
- Occupation: Musician
- Instrument: Guitar

Terence Smith (born 20 May 1943) is a British jazz guitarist.

== Biography ==
Twice winner of the Melody Maker Music Polls, Smith spent the early 1960s playing with the Tony Lee Trio, before becoming Scott Walker's musical director and accompanying The Walker Brothers on their Japan tour in 1968. Returning to the UK, he recorded a solo album, Fall Out (1968), which was produced by Scott Walker, and backed by UK jazz musicians of the day such as Kenny Wheeler, Les Condon, Ronnie Ross, Ronnie Stephenson, Gordon Beck, Ron Mathewson, Chris Karan, and Ray Warleigh. Smith went on to join the US soul singer J.J. Jackson's Greatest Little Soul Band in the Land, with whom he recorded two LPs: The Greatest Little Soul Band in the Land (1969) and J.J. Jackson's Dilemma (1970).

In 1969, he teamed up with saxophonists Dick Morrissey and Dave Quincy, also members of Jackson's band, to form the pioneering British jazz-rock group If.

Around that time he also appeared with Morrissey and other top British jazz musicians on Brother Jack McDuff's Blue Note recording To Seek a New Home (1970).

Smith went on to record five albums with If's original line-up, as well as touring the U.S. and Europe extensively. Following the break-up of If's first line-up, he co-founded another British band, ZZebra, also with Dave Quincy from If.

He met up again with Dick Morrissey and they appear together with leading Swedish jazz musicians and pop singer Tommy Körberg for a live recording Don't Get Around Much Anymore - Live at Bullerbyn (1975).

In 1981, Smith formed his own Blues Band in 1982 with Jo Ann Kelly (vocals), Tony Ashton (organ) and Micky Waller (drums). As of October 2006, he is still active on the UK jazz circuit.

== Discography ==
=== As leader/co-leader ===
- Fall Out (Philips, 1969)
- Don't Get Around Much Anymore – Live at Bullerbyn (1975)
- Terry Smith with the Tony Lee Trio (1977)
- Tenderly (2008)

With If

- If (1970)
- If 2 (1970)
- If 3 (1971)
- If 4 (1972)
- Waterfall (1972)
- Forgotten Roads: The Best of If (1995)
- Europe '72 (Live) (1997)

=== As sideman ===
- The Greatest Little Soul Band in the Land (1969) with J. J. Jackson
- J.J. Jackson's Dilemma (1970) with J. J. Jackson
- To Seek a New Home (1970) – Brother Jack McDuff
