= Phil Bates (jazz musician) =

English jazz double bassist (1931–2007)

Philip Francis Bates (19 June 1931 – 11 July 2007) was an English jazz double bassist.

== Life and career ==
Bates was born in Brixton, London, on 19 June 1931. After playing regular gigs at London’s 51 Club with Harry Klein and Vic Ash throughout 1956, he joined The Jazz Couriers with Tubby Hayes and Ronnie Scott. After the Couriers disbanded, Bates toured with Sarah Vaughan and played with the Lennie Metcalfe Band on the Cunard liner the RMS Mauretania.

In the early 1960s he worked with Johnny Dankworth and Ronnie Ross, among others, before joining Dick Morrissey's Quartet from October 1962 until 1968. During that period he also played with the Harry South Big Band, as did the other members of the quartet, and with the Tony Kinsey Quintet. In 1968 he played briefly again with Tubby Hayes.

From 1968 on, he worked as a session musician, accompanying visiting US artists such as Sonny Stitt, Jimmy Witherspoon, Judy Collins and Tom Paxton, before spending five years touring Europe with Stéphane Grappelli in the late 1970s. In the 1980s and 1990s, he led his own trio and gave tuition.

Bates died in London on 11 July 2007, aged 76.

== Sources ==
- John Chilton, Who's Who of British Jazz, 2004. Continuum International Publishing Group, ISBN 0-8264-7234-6
