= J.W. Hodkinson =

British singer (1942–2013)

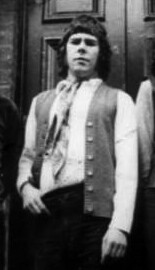
Hodkinson in 1970

John William Hodkinson (29 December 1942 – 9 June 2013), also known as J.W. Hodkinson or J.W. Hodgkinson, was a British rock vocalist.

Hodkinson was born in Leigh, Lancashire, now in Greater Manchester, England. After performing as Johnny Goode, with Larry Parnes' "The Big New Rock 'n' Trad Spectacular", and billed as a "Teenage Idol" with Billy Raymond, Georgie Fame, Billy Fury and Jimmie Nicol, in 1961, he recorded, as Tony Allen, the first of a series of 45s for Philips, all with arrangements by Ivor Raymonde. In 1966, he sang the theme track for the United Artists spy thriller film Triple Cross, starring Christopher Plummer and Yul Brynner. In 1964, he joined The Shubdubs with Jimmie Nicol, Bob Garner, Johnny Harris, Quincy Davis, and Roger Coulam.

In the late 1960s, he became a founding member of the pioneering British jazz-rock band If, appearing on their first five albums. When the band's first line-up broke up, in 1972-3, he joined Darryl Way's Wolf, and appeared on the album Night Music (1974).

In 1975, Hodkinson, alongside Guy Fletcher and Al Hodge, became a founder-member of the soft rock band Rogue.

== Discography ==
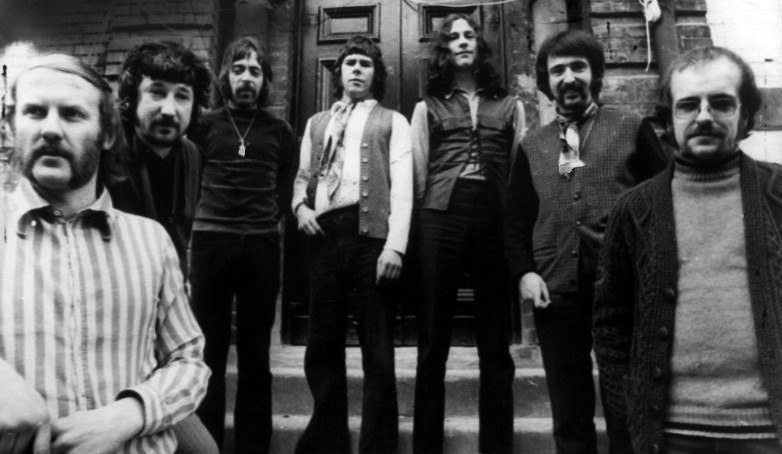
Hodkinson (fourth from left) as part of the band If in 1970

As leader/co-leader

- "Time to Swing" - 43361 BE
- 1961: "When Love Comes to Call" c/w "Mr. Happiness" - Philips PB 1117
- 1962: "There Is Always a First Time" - Philips 326539 BF
- 1963: "That Little Touch of Magic" - Philips BF 1252
- 1966: "Triple Cross" - United Artists

=== With If ===
- 1970: If 1
- 1970: If 2
- 1971: If 3
- 1972: If 4
- 1972: Waterfall (U.S. version of If 4)

=== With Darryl Way's Wolf ===
- 1974: Night Music

=== With Rogue ===
- 1975: Fallen Angel
- 1977: Let It Go
- 1979: Would You Let Your Daughter
