= Harry South =

English pianist, composer and arranger (1929–1990)

- Born: Harry Percy South; 7 September 1929; Fulham, London, England
- Died: 12 March 1990 (aged 60) Lambeth, London
- Genres: Jazz
- Occupations: Musician, composer, arranger
- Instrument: Piano
- Years active: 1950–1990

Harry Percy South (7 September 1929 – 12 March 1990) was an English jazz pianist, composer, and arranger, who moved into work for film and television.

== Career ==
South was born in Fulham, London. He came to prominence in the 1950s, playing with Joe Harriott, Dizzy Reece, Tony Crombie, and Tubby Hayes. In 1954, he was in the Tony Crombie Orchestra with Dizzy Reece, Les Condon (trumpet), Joe Temperley, Sammy Walker (tenor sax), Lennie Dawes (baritone sax), and Ashley Kozak (bass).

After returning from a 9-month tour of Calcutta, India, with the Ashley Kozak Quartet, he spent four years with the Dick Morrissey Quartet, where he both wrote and arranged material for their subsequent four albums.

He formed the Harry South Big Band in 1966 with a star lineup - Dick Morrissey, Phil Seamen, Keith Christie, Ronnie Scott and Ian Carr - specifically to record an album, Presenting the Harry South Big Band, for Mercury Records. The eight tracks span "Latin, ballads and straight-forward swingers".

In the mid-1960s, he began working with British rhythm & blues singer and organist Georgie Fame, recording the album Sound Venture. At that time he was also composing and arranging for Humphrey Lyttelton, Buddy Rich, Sarah Vaughan, and Jimmy Witherspoon. He worked as musical director for Annie Ross.

He branched out into session work, writing themes for television and music libraries, including the themes for The Sweeney, The Chinese Detective, the BBC comedy series Give Us a Break starring Robert Lindsay and Paul McGann, and the 1984 TV miniseries Charlie starring David Warner. He wrote the scores for the Pete Walker films The Big Switch (1968), School for Sex (1969), and Four Dimensions of Greta (1972).

He is credited with the arrangements used for Emerson, Lake & Palmer's Works Vol. 1 (1977). In 1981, he again arranged for Annie Ross and Georgie Fame in a collaboration on what was to be Hoagy Carmichael's last recording, In Hoagland.

He died on 12 March 1990 in Lambeth, London, at the age of 60. In 2001, the National Youth Jazz Orchestra released an album in his honour entitled Portraits: The Music of Harry South. In 2017 Rhythm and Blues Records released a four CD set titled Harry South: The Songbook, with over sixty of his compositions played by various groups, some of which he played in. Included are early tracks with Tubby Hayes and nearly 40 sides by The Harry South Big Band, dating from 1960 to 1975. A further 4 CD set (taken from tapes of BBC broadcasts in the 1960s) followed two years later.

== Discography ==
- Presenting the Harry South Big Band (Mercury, 1966)

With Dick Morrissey

- Have You Heard? (77 Records, 1963)
- Storm Warning! (Mercury, 1966)
- Here and Now and Sounding Good! (Mercury, 1967)
- There and Back (Ronnie Scott's Jazz House, 1997)
- The Lost 77 Recordings (Jazzhus, 2011)
- Live Storm Warning! Manchester 1966 (Jazzhus, 2011)

With others

- Vic Ash, The Quintet & Jazz Five Studio & Live Recordings 1959–1961 (Acrobat, 2014)
- Hoagy Carmichael/Georgie Fame/Annie Ross, In Hoagland (1981)
- Tony Crombie, Tony Crombie and His Orchestra (Decca, 1954)
- Jimmy Deuchar, Pal Jimmy (Tempo, 1958)
- Georgie Fame, Sound Venture (1966)
- Joe Harriott, Southern Horizons (Jazzland, 1960)
- Tubby Hayes, Little Giant of Jazz (Imperial, 1957)
- Phil Seamen, Phil Seamen Story (Decibel, 1972)
- Sonny Stitt, Sonny's Blues: Live at Ronnie Scott's Club (Ronnie Scott's Jazz House, 1995)
- Jimmy Witherspoon, Spoon Sings 'n' Swings (Fontana, 1966)
