= Dick Morrissey =

British jazz saxophonist and flautist (1940–2000)

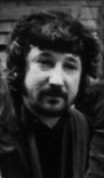
- Morrissey in 1970

Background information
- Born: Richard Edwin Morrissey; 9 May 1940; Horley, Surrey, England
- Died: 8 November 2000 (aged 60) Deal, Kent, England
- Genres: Jazz; hard bop; soul jazz; jazz rock; jazz fusion
- Occupations: Musician; composer
- Instruments: Tenor saxophone; soprano saxophone; flute
- Years active: c. 1960 – 2000
- Label: Various
- Formerly of: If; Soft Machine

Richard Edwin Morrissey (9 May 1940 – 8 November 2000) was a British jazz musician and composer. He played the tenor saxophone, soprano saxophone and flute and was known primarily as one of the leading UK jazz musicians of his era, but also worked occasionally in rock, R&B and other genres.

== Biography ==
=== Background ===
He was born in Horley, Surrey, England. Dick Morrissey emerged in the early 1960s in the wake of Tubby Hayes, Britain's pre-eminent sax player at the time. Self-taught, he started playing clarinet in his school band, The Delta City Jazzmen, at the age of sixteen with fellow pupils Robin Mayhew (trumpet), Eric Archer (trombone), Steve Pennells (banjo), Glyn Greenfield (drums), and young brother Chris on tea-chest bass. He then joined the Original Climax Jazz Band. Going on to join trumpeter Gus Galbraith's Septet, where alto-sax player Peter King introduced him to Charlie Parker's recordings, he began specialising on tenor saxophone shortly after.

Making his name as a hard bop player, he appeared regularly at the Marquee Club from August 1960, and recorded his first solo album at the age of 21, It's Morrissey, Man! (1961) for Fontana, featuring Stan Jones on piano, Colin Barnes on drums, and The Jazz Couriers founding member Malcolm Cecil on bass. He spent most of 1962 in Calcutta, India as part of the Ashley Kozak Quartet, playing three two-hour sessions seven days a week, before returning to the UK and forming his quartet with Harry South – who had also been in the quartet in Calcutta – on piano. They were joined by former The Jazz Couriers bassist Phil Bates and variously, another ex-The Jazz Couriers member, Bill Eyden, Jackie Dougan or Phil Seamen on drums. The Dick Morrissey Quartet recorded three LPs, Have You Heard? (1963); the live recording Storm Warning! (1965) on Mercury; and Here and Now and Sounding Good! (1966). The quartet, played regular London gigs at The Bull's Head, Barnes and at Ronnie Scott's, whose manager, Pete King, once said that Ronnie's was kept going in those days due to the crowds Dick Morrissey pulled in. During this time he also played extensively in bands led by Ian Hamer and Harry South, including The Six Sounds, featuring Ken Wray and Dick Morrissey, a band which by 1966 had developed into the Ian Hamer Sextet featuring South, Dick Morrissey, Keith Christie, Kenny Napper and Bill Eyden, among other leading UK-based jazz musicians.

He also played briefly in Ted Heath's Big Band, which featured many name jazz musicians over the years, as well as appearing as a featured guest on the classic Johnny Dankworth and his Orchestra recording, What the Dickens! and the Harry South Big Band. Likewise, together with fellow tenors Stan Robinson and Al Gay, baritone sax Paul Carroll, and trumpets Ian Carr, Kenny Wheeler and Greg Brown, Dick Morrissey formed part of (Eric Burdon and) The Animals' Big Band that made its one-and-only public appearance at the 5th Annual British Jazz & Blues Festival in Richmond (1965).

By the mid-1960s, he had over two consecutive years come in second place behind Hayes in the Melody Maker Jazz Poll (1966 & 1967). Many US musicians touring Britain during the Sixties and early Seventies recorded with him. They included Brother Jack McDuff, a live recording with Jimmy Witherspoon, two LPs with J. J. Jackson, and Sonny Stitt together with guitarist Ernest Ranglin (live at Ronnie Scott's).

Dick Morrissey performed regularly at the National Jazz Festival in the 1960s; his last appearance under his own name there was at the 6th festival held at Windsor (1966), although he would return to the festival with If in 1972 for their only appearance.

In 1969, Dick Morrissey, by then many-time winner and runner-up of the Melody Maker Jazz Poll, teamed up with another Melody Maker award-winner, guitarist Terry Smith, with whom he had worked in J. J. Jackson's Band, to form an early jazz-rock group, If.

=== Morrissey–Mullen ===
When If disbanded in 1975, Dick Morrissey went to Germany on a tour with Alexis Korner and then to the United States to tour and record with the Average White Band, and met up with Glaswegian guitarist, Jim Mullen, who had played with Brian Auger's Oblivion Express with some of the members of AWB, and together they formed Morrissey–Mullen, recording their first album, Up (1976) in New York. During their stay in New York, word got around, and soon big names began arriving to join them for jam sessions, such as Steve Gadd, David Sanborn, George Benson and, every night for a week, the Brecker Brothers. On returning to Great Britain, Morrissey–Mullen formed a band which rapidly became Britain's most highly acclaimed jazz-fusion band of the day, initially including two top session musicians from New Zealand, Frank Gibson, Jr. and Bruce Lynch.

Morrissey-Mullen recorded seven albums over the 16 years they were together, with Morrissey and Mullen collaborating on each other's solo albums, notably After Dark (1983) with John Critchinson, Ron Mathewson, Martin Drew, Barry Whitworth. The line-up for later gigs also featured John Burch on piano, with whom Dick Morrissey would also form an informal group called "Our Band", also featuring Louis Stewart and/or Jim Mullen on guitar, as well as the above-mentioned Ron Mathewson and Martin Drew. The Average White Band both played on and produced the first album UP with backup vocals provided by Luther Vandross, Cissi Houston and others.

During that period, Dick Morrissey also recorded Souliloquy (1986), featuring Max Middleton, Kuma Harada, Robert Ahwai (all three of whom had also appeared on Morrissey–Mullen's first UK-recorded album, Cape Wrath, in 1979), Steve Ferrone, Danny Cummings, Bob Weston and Lenny Zakatek.

=== Other collaborations ===
As well as leading his own jazz combos, as a "musicians' musician," Dick Morrissey was in continuous demand as a guest artist with other British or UK-based jazz musicians, most especially with trios and quartets. Thus he was often to be found jamming with established names such as Tubby Hayes, Bill Le Sage, Roy Budd, Ian Hamer, Ian Carr, Tony Lee, Tony Archer, Michael Garrick (who dedicated him his 1965 composition "Leprechaun Leap"), Spike Robinson, Allan Ganley, alto saxophonist Peter King, Ray Warleigh, etc.

In between regular M&M gigs, Dick Morrissey would also meet up with old friends Ian "Stu" Stewart, Charlie Watts, Alexis Korner, Jack Bruce, Colin Hodgkinson, Don Weller, Zoot Money, John Picard and Colin Smith, to play boogie-woogie/jazz/rock with the back-to-the-roots fun band, Rocket 88, that Stewart put together with boogie-woogie pianist Bob Hall.

Apart from the early recordings with visiting US performers mentioned above, Dick Morrissey also toured and/or recorded with Charly Antolini, Alexis Korner (several albums), Hoagy Carmichael, participating on Hoagy's last album, In Hoagland (1981) featuring Georgie Fame and Annie Ross, with arrangements by Harry South, Mike Carr, Georgie Fame, Brian Auger, Dusty Springfield, Freddie Mack, Pete York, Paul McCartney, Orange Juice, Gary Numan (he appeared on a number of Numan's albums throughout the 1980s), Phil Carmen, Herbie Mann, Shakatak, Peter Gabriel (the solo in "Start" and several other tracks from his third album), Jon Anderson (and as a member of the New Life Band's The Song of Seven Tour in 1980), Demis Roussos, Jon & Vangelis and Vangelis, Gino Vanelli, as well as playing the haunting saxophone solo on the Vangelis composition "Love Theme" for the 1982 film Blade Runner.

Other musicians and performers Dick Morrissey shared the stage with include Allan Holdsworth, Robert Fripp, David "Fathead" Newman, Tommy Körberg, Boz Scaggs, Johnny Griffin, David Sanborn, Steve Gadd, Richard Tee, Billy Cobham, Michael Brecker, Randy Brecker, Sonny Fortune, Sonny Sharrock and Teddy Edwards (with whom he jammed a "duel" at London's 100 Club in the early 1980s), Mel Collins, Dick Heckstall-Smith, John Surman, Graham Bond, Klaus Doldinger, Al Casey, Miller Anderson, Bridget St. John, Paul Carrack, The Style Council, Daryl Hall, Ringo Starr, Keith Emerson, Shakatak, Alex Harvey and so on.

Whatever the style of music he was playing, be it pop, rock, hard bop or straight ahead jazz, Dick Morrissey showed that music could be appreciated at many different levels, and that even the most simplistic pop or rock song could be embellished with an authentic jazz groove. In this way he was able to reach new audiences and albeit indirectly, introduce people to jazz. When at different stages of his career, journalists asked him to define his style, he would refer to Duke Ellington's definition: "It's all music" and pointing out that for Ellington there were only two types of music: "good" or "bad". To that end, his last few recordings concentrated more than ever on jazz standards and the Great American Songbook.

=== Death ===
Morrissey died on 8 November 2000, aged 60, after many years fighting various forms of cancer. To the end of his life, he could be seen and heard, seated in his wheelchair, playing to a full house at his local pub, The Alma, in Deal, Kent. His last gig was a reunion with the Morrissey–Mullen band (including Jim Mullen and Pete Jacobsen) at the Astor theatre in Deal. His funeral, held in Deal, was attended by many of his fellow musicians including Allan Ganley. Following his death, the UK national press published the following obituaries (excerpts):

In the obituary published in The Times, British music critic Chris Welch wrote that Dick Morrissey was a

"fiery musician who straddled the worlds of jazz and rock, but with a style built firmly on bebop and widely regarded as the most brilliant British saxophonist to emerge in the wake of Tubby Hayes. His advocacy of jazz-rock fusion successfully brought jazz to a rock audience and rock to a jazz audience".

Steve Voce wrote in The Independent's obituary that Morrissey had the

"ability to get through to an audience. He was one of the great communicators of jazz and ... able to communicate with his listeners and quickly to establish a bond with them ... [l]ike Charlie Parker before him, he was somehow able to lift audiences that knew little or nothing about his music".

Although one could from time to time imagine a feel of the American players Sonny Rollins or Johnny Griffin in Morrissey's work, he was outstanding among British players for his originality. Despite the sophistication of his ideas there was often a down-home quality to his punchy and hard swinging solos, and this was a reflection of one of his idols, the tenorist Stanley Turrentine. He was a lightning improviser and the flood of his inventions flew through his fingers with ease, for he was a masterful player."

Ronald Atkins, writing in The Guardian, put it thus:

"John Coltrane's approach to the tenor had yet to make much of an impact in Britain, and Morrissey came up with a startling and warmly appreciated blend of Stan Getz and Sonny Rollins, the phrasing of one allied to the abrasive tones of the other. He was also influenced by the example of Tubby Hayes, whose lightening-quick [sic] forays through complex harmonies he was probably the first to emulate".

The obituary in The Daily Telegraph read:

"Dick Morrissey, who has died aged 60, was among the finest European jazz musicians of his generation. His command of the tenor saxophone was masterly, but it was the unforced fluency of his playing, expressed in a characteristically broad and sweeping tone, that attracted the greatest admiration.

Stylistically, Morrissey was so flexible that he was able to fit happily into many contexts, from straightforward hard-bop, through jazz-rock and jazz-funk to soul-inflected pop music. He possessed the remarkable knack of making everything he played sound not only exciting but happy."

== Discography ==
=== Albums ===
- It's Morrissey, Man! (1961) – The Dick Morrissey Quartet
- Have You Heard? (1963) – The Dick Morrissey Quartet
- There and Back (live 1964/1965 – released 1997) – The Dick Morrissey Quartet
- Storm Warning! (live Nov. 1965) – The Dick Morrissey Quartet
- Here and Now and Sounding Good! (September 1966) – The Dick Morrissey Quartet
- Sonny's Blues: Live at Ronnie Scott's (live 1966) – Sonny Stitt with The Dick Morrissey Quartet
- Spoon Sings and Swings (live 1966) – Jimmy Witherspoon with The Dick Morrissey Quartet
- After Dark – Dick Morrissey (1983)
- Souliloquy – Dick Morrissey (1986)
- Resurrection Ritual – Dick Morrissey (1988)
- Love Dance – Dick Morrissey (live 1989)
- Charly Antolini Meets Dick Morrissey (live 1990)

=== With If ===
- If – aka If 1 (1970)
- If 2 (1970)
- If 3 (1971)
- If 4 (1972)
- Waterfall (1972)
- Double Diamond (1973)
- Not Just Another Bunch of Pretty Faces – If (1974)
- Tea Break Over, Back on Your 'Eads – If (1974)

=== With Morrissey–Mullen ===
- Up – (Embryo Records, 1976)
- Cape Wrath – 1979
- Badness – 1981
- Life on the Wire – 1982
- It's About Time – 1983
- This Must Be the Place – 1985
- Happy Hour – 1988
- Everything Must Change: The Definitive Collection – 2003

=== Collaborations ===
- What the Dickens! – Johnny Dankworth and his Orchestra (1963)
- Roy Budd – Roy Budd (1965)
- Presenting the Harry South Big Band (January 1966)
- Sound Venture – Georgie Fame and the Harry South Big Band (October 1966)
- Acropolis – Ian Hamer Sextet (live 1966)
- Two Faces of Fame – Georgie Fame (1967)
- Retrospect Through 21 Years of BBC Jazz Club – Various Artists (1968)
- The Greatest Little Soul Band in the Land – J. J. Jackson (1969)
- J. J. Jackson's Dilemma (1970)
- To Seek a New Home – Brother Jack McDuff (1970)
- Whitehorn – Geoff Whitehorn (1974)
- Worlds Collide – Hudson Ford (1975)
- Don't Get Around Much Anymore – Live at Bullerbyn (live 1975)
- The Atlantic Family Live at Montreux – (live 1977)
- A Pauper in Paradise – Gino Vannelli (1977)
- The Party Album – Alexis Korner (live 1978)
- It's Just a Lifetime – Craig Nuttycombe (1978)
- Just Easy – Alexis Korner (1978)
- Ravenna – Kim Diamond (1979)
- That's What Friends Are For – Georgie Fame and the Blue Flames (1979)
- Liner – Liner (1979)
- White Trails – Chris Rainbow (1979)
- Streets of Fire – Duncan Browne (1979)
- Lost in Austin – Marc Benno (1979)
- Peter Gabriel (III) – aka Melt – Peter Gabriel (1980)
- Alexis Korner and Friends (1980)
- "Strawberry Letter 23" – Bunny Brown (1980)
- Song of Seven – Jon Anderson (1980)
- Mr Money – Zoot Money (1980)
- Wonderin' – Rollercoaster (1980)
- Live in Sheffield 1980 – Jon Anderson / New Life Band (recorded live December 1980 – released 2007)
- Honky – Keith Emerson (1981)
- The Friends of Mr Cairo – Jon & Vangelis (1981)
- In Hoagland – Hoagy Carmichael/Georgie Fame/Annie Ross (1981)
- Compare me with the rest – Ronny/Vangelis (1981) maxi single
- Land of Cockayne – Soft Machine (1981)
- Gone with the Wind (single) – Diamond Edge (1981)
- Love Theme from movie Blade Runner – Vangelis (1982) (Morrissey's last name is misspelled in the CD credits as "Morrisey")
- Night Birds – Shakatak (1982)
- Animation – Jon Anderson (1982)
- "Rip It Up (single)" – Orange Juice (1982)
- Ride Blue Divide – Sniff 'n' the Tears (1982)
- Now Then... – Stiff Little Fingers (1982)
- Work of Heart – Roy Harper (1982)
- Private Collection – Jon & Vangelis (1983)
- Warriors – Gary Numan (1983)
- Sirens – John Themis (1983)
- Give My Regards to Broad Street – Paul McCartney
- Reflection – Demis Roussos (1984)
- Brass Impact (1984)
- Double Crossed – Jim Diamond (1985)
- "My Heart Knows" – Maxine Nightingale (1985)
- Famous People – Bill Sharpe (1985)
- The Fury – Gary Numan (1985)
- Invitation – Shakatak (1985)
- Press to Play – Paul McCartney (1986)
- Animal Magic – The Blow Monkeys (1986)
- Three Hearts in the Happy Ending Machine (1986) – Daryl Hall
- On a Blue Wing – Bill Nelson (1986)
- Strange Charm – Gary Numan (1986)
- City Walls – Phil Carmen (1987)
- Face to Face – Barclay James Harvest (1987)
- Live at the Bull – Tribute Vols. 1–2 (recorded live 1987/8 – released 2007) with Spike Robinson
- Confessions of a Pop Group – The Style Council (1988)
- Metal Rhythm – Gary Numan (1988)
- A New World (album) – Sonia King (1988)
- Old Angel Midnight – Jackson Sloan (1989)
- Mastercrime – Zeke Manyika (1989)
- Changes – Phil Carmen (1989)
- The Lady from Savannah – Irene Reid (1989) Birdland MC589
- Cookin' – Charly Antolini (live 1989)
- Shout For Joy – Neville Dickie and His Rhythm Kings (live 1989)
- Tippin' the Scales – Perfect Pitch (live 1989)
- Super Jam – (Villa Fantastica) – with Brian Auger/Pete York (live 1989)
- Daddy and the Steamers – Pete York (live 1990)
- Shaking the Tree – Peter Gabriel (1990)
- Portraits (The Music of Harry South) – NYJO (1990) as a guest, along with Ronnie Ross
- Swinging Hollywood – Pete York (1991)
- Outland – Gary Numan (1991)
- Skyline – Phil Carmen (1993)
- Good Times & the Blues – Mike Carr (live 1993)
- Right-On – Charly Antolini (live 1993)
- Superblues – Pete York (1994)
