= Vic Ash =

English musician (1930–2014)

- Born: Victor Ash; 9 March 1930; London, England
- Died: 24 October 2014 (aged 84)
- Genres: Jazz
- Occupation: Musician
- Instruments: Saxophone; Clarinet
- Years active: 1951-2014

Victor "Vic" Ash (9 March 1930 – 24 October 2014) was an English jazz saxophonist and clarinettist.

== Biography ==
Ash was born in East London in 1930, and was of Jewish ancestry. He began learning clarinet at the age of 14, then switched to saxes. After working as a salesman he began playing professionally in 1951 when, with Tubby Hayes, he joined the band of Kenny Baker, with whom he played until 1953. Following this association, Ash played with Vic Lewis (1953–56), then accompanied Hoagy Carmichael and Cab Calloway on their English tours.

He led his own group and was a favourite in the Melody Maker fan polls of the 1950s; concurrently he had a radio program called Sunday Break, which discussed jazz and religion. In 1954, the Vic Ash Quartet recorded with US singer Maxine Sullivan in London. Ash toured the U.S. in 1957 and returned to play with Lewis in 1959. His ensemble was the only one representing British jazz at the Newport Jazz Festival that year.

Ash remained a mainstay of the British jazz scene for decades, playing in small and large ensembles including the BBC Big Band and Harry Stoneham's Band. He accompanied Frank Sinatra on tours in Europe and the Middle East (such as the Aryamehr concert) from 1970 until Sinatra's death, and also accompanied Peggy Lee, Lena Horne and Tony Bennett.

Ash released many albums for Pye, Nixa and MGM, mostly in the mainstream jazz tradition. Vic Ash's co-authored autobiography I Blew It My Way (Northway Publications) was published in 2006.

== Personal life and death ==
Ash was the cousin of guitarist Maurice Ash. He died on 24 October 2014, survived by his wife, Helen, whom he had married in 1982.
