= John Mealing =

British musician

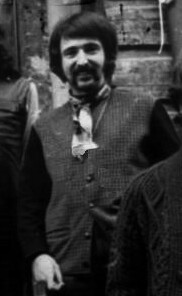
Mealing in 1970

John Mealing (born 5 April 1942 (age 83) in Yeovil, Somerset) is a British keyboardist, composer and arranger.

After leaving the Don Rendell-Ian Carr Quintet in the late sixties, he joined the pioneering British jazz-rock band If until they came off the road in 1972. Subsequently appearing on albums by Klaus Doldinger's Passport, Mick Ronson, Leo Sayer, John Entwistle, Status Quo, and ex-King Crimson drummer Michael Giles, he went on to join Strawbs following the departure of John Hawken.

In the mid-eighties, Mealing did arrangements for several hit British albums by bands such as The Style Council and The Pet Shop Boys.

Between 1986 and 1993, he composed the music to the hit BBC Television quiz shows Every Second Counts and Bob's Full House. He is credited with the music for the 1991 The Secret Policeman's Biggest Ball.

He is also credited as co-composer of the theme tune to the British TV comedy-drama series Press Gang which ran from 1989 to 1993.
