= The Great J. J. Jackson =

Compilation album by J. J. Jackson
- Released: 1969
- Genre: Soul-jazz
- Label: Warner Bros.
- Producer: Lew Futterman

J. J. Jackson chronology
But It's Alright (1967)	The Great J. J. Jackson (1969)	The Greatest Little Soul Band in the Land (1969)

The Great J. J. Jackson is the second album released by J. J. Jackson. The album was released in 1969 on Warner Bros. Records.

== History ==
The album was released in 1969 by Warner Bros. Records, following the successful 1969 re-release by Warner Bros. of Jackson's 1966 hit single, "But It's Alright". Warner Bros. had acquired from Jackson's former record company, Calla Records, the rights to Jackson's first album, which included "But It's Alright". "But It's Alright" and four other songs from Jackson's first album were included on The Great J. J. Jackson. The balance of the album consisted of non-album singles released on Calla Records, plus A-sides and B-sides of singles Jackson had released in 1968 and 1969 on Loma Records, a Warner Bros. affiliate label, and Warner Bros. Records.

== Reaction ==
The music is regarded as being consistent across periods, with Jackson being described as "a man devoted to old-school soul", rather than following trends.

Critically described as "the definitive J. J. Jackson collection", in 2009 The Great J. J. Jackson was re-released, on CD, by Collector's Choice. The re-release included as additional tracks the remaining songs from Jackson's first album on Calla Records that had not been included in the original release of The Great J. J. Jackson.

== Track listing ==
No.	Title	Writer(s)	Length
1.	"But It's Alright"	Jackson, Tubbs	3:07
2.	"It Seems Like I've Been Here Before"	Jackson, Windsor King	2:55
3.	"Too Late"	Jackson, King	2:23
4.	"Courage Ain't Strength"	Meshel	2:23
5.	"A Change Is Gonna Come"	Sam Cooke	2:14
6.	"Sho Nuff (Got a Good Thing Going)"	Fisher, Jackson, King	2:58
7.	"Four Walls (Three Windows and Two Doors)"	King, Jackson	2:16
8.	"I Don't Want to Live My Life Alone"	Jackson, Barnes	3:04
9.	"Try Me"	McCorkle, Jackson	2:23
10.	"Down but Not Out"	Jackson, King	3:04
11.	"That Ain't Right"	Foster, Jessup	2:31
12.	"I Dig Girls"	Ben E. King	2:18

=== Additional tracks ===
- "You've Got Me Dizzy" (Reed)
- "Come See Me (I'm Your Man)" (Jackson, Tubbs, Barnes)
- "The Stones I Throw" (Robertson)
- "Give Me Back the Love" (Paul, Green, King)
- "Ain't Too Proud To Beg"
- "Love Is a Hurtin' Thing"
- "Boogaloo Baby" (Lewis, Jackson)
- "Let It Out" (Barkan, Meltzer)

== Credits ==
=== Original recording ===
- Produced by Lew Futterman
- Arranged By J. J. Jackson
- Art Direction by Ed Thrasher
- Cover Illustration by David Willardson

=== 2009 reissue ===
- Produced by Gordon Anderson
- Mastered by Bob Fisher
- Liner notes by Gene Sculatti
