= Wild Palms =

American miniseries (1993)

- Wild Palms main cast (listed below, L to R)
- Created by: Bruce Wagner
- Written by: Bruce Wagner
- Starring: Nick Mancuso; Bebe Neuwirth; Angie Dickinson; Dana Delany; James Belushi; Kim Cattrall; Robert Loggia
- Music by: Ryuichi Sakamoto
- Country of origin: United States
- Original language: English
- No. of episodes: 5 (4 in original airings)

Production
- Executive producers: Oliver Stone; Bruce Wagner
- Producer: Michael Rauch
- Running time: 285 minutes
- Production companies: Ixtlan; Greengrass Productions

Original release
- Network: ABC
- Release: May 16 – May 19, 1993

Wild Palms is a five-hour miniseries which was produced by Greengrass Productions and first aired in May 1993 on the ABC network in the United States. The sci-fi drama, announced as an "event series", deals with the dangers of politically motivated abuse of mass media technology and virtual realities in particular. It is based on a comic strip written by Bruce Wagner and illustrated by Julian Allen first published in 1990 in Details magazine. Wagner, who also wrote the screenplay, served as executive producer together with Oliver Stone. The series stars James Belushi, Dana Delany, Robert Loggia, Kim Cattrall, Bebe Neuwirth, David Warner, and Angie Dickinson. The episodes were directed by Kathryn Bigelow, Keith Gordon, Peter Hewitt and Phil Joanou.

== Plot synopsis ==
In the United States in the year 2007, the right-wing Fathers dominate large sections of politics and the media. A libertarian movement called the Friends opposes the government, often making use of underground guerrilla tactics. The Fathers' leader is California Senator Tony Kreutzer, who is also the leader of the Scientology-like Church of Synthiotics and the owner of the Wild Palms media group. Kreutzer's Channel 3 TV station is about to launch Church Windows, a VR sitcom that projects characters into viewers' homes using a system called Mimecom.

Harry Wyckoff is a successful patent attorney on the brink of becoming a partner in the law firm where he works. He has two children with his wife Grace, a perfect housewife who also owns a boutique. His 11-year-old son Coty has just been cast for Church Windows, while his 4-year-old daughter Deirdre has been mute from birth. His mother-in-law is the chic socialite and artist Josie Ito, a woman of strong will and numerous connections. At night Wyckoff is plagued by strange dreams of a rhinoceros and a faceless woman who has palm trees tattooed on her body.

One day, he is visited by Paige Katz, a former lover during his college days. Paige asks for his help in tracking down her son Peter, who disappeared five years earlier. Paige is closely associated with the Wild Palms group, which Wyckoff's firm is going up against in court. Wyckoff is passed over for promotion due to the seeming conflict of interest. After this, he gladly accepts when Kreutzer offers him a high-paying job at Channel 3.

In the wake of his new career, Grace becomes alienated from him and attempts suicide. To his dismay, Harry learns that Coty is actually the son of Kreutzer and Paige and that her search request was a plot to bring him and the Senator together. Coty becomes not only a TV star but also — due to his privileged upbringing and personal ruthlessness — a high-ranking member of the Church of Synthiotics. Josie turns out to be the Senator's sister who disposes of potential rivals with the same violently brutal means as her brother. Her only weak point is her affection for her estranged husband Eli Levitt, Grace's father and leader of the Friends.

Kreutzer plans to marry Paige and tries to get hold of the Go chip, which would enable him to become an immortal living hologram. He uses all means possible to acquire the chip, but Paige is disgusted by his methods and gives information to the Friends. Harry discovers that Peter, a boy who has connections to the Friends, is his real son who was taken away by the Fathers shortly after his birth. Kreutzer, who suspects Harry of collaborating with his opponents, has him tortured, and kidnaps Deirdre, while Josie strangles Grace.

Harry joins the Friends and uses his access to Channel 3 to broadcast a Mimecom recording of Grace's murder that causes a social uproar. Synthiotics facilities and the campaign offices of Kreutzer (who is now running for president) are attacked. The Fathers try unsuccessfully to defuse the situation by killing Eli and broadcasting a fake video that depicts Harry as Grace's killer. Josie is brutally killed by a former victim, Tully Woiwode. Kreutzer finally manages to get hold of the Go chip and has it implanted, but not before it is secretly altered by Harry and Peter. Kreutzer reveals to Harry that he is his biological father, then loses cohesion and dissolves into nothingness. Harry and Paige rescue Deirdre from Coty, who briefly tries to salvage the remnants of the church. Harry and Paige drive into the sunset with Deirdre and Peter.

== Episodes ==
ABC aired the miniseries over four consecutive nights. Episodes 2 and 3 were originally combined into a two-hour broadcast:

- 1993-05-16: "Everything Must Go" (approx. 93 minutes) - directed by Peter Hewitt
- 1993-05-17: "The Floating World" (title not used in ABC airing) (approx. 48 minutes; 95 minutes in original airing) - directed by Keith Gordon
- 1993-05-17: "Rising Sons" (approx. 49 minutes; 95 minutes in original airing) - directed by Kathryn Bigelow
- 1993-05-18: "Hungry Ghosts" (approx. 48 minutes) - directed by Keith Gordon
- 1993-05-19: "Hello, I Must Be Going" (approx. 48 minutes) - directed by Phil Joanou

== Cast ==
- James Belushi as Harry Wyckoff, a Beverly Hills based patent attorney and later, CEO of the Wild Palms group.
- Dana Delany as Grace Wyckoff, his wife, suburban housewife and owner of Hiroshima, a retro fashion boutique.
- Ben Savage as Coty Wyckoff, their 11-year-old son, a child actor on the verge of a breakthrough to stardom.
- Robert Loggia as Senator Anton "Tony" Kreutzer, former sci-fi author, founder of the Wild Palms group and the Synthiotics cult.
- Angie Dickinson as Josie Ito, Grace's mother, a celebrated interior decorator with numerous connections and secrets.
- David Warner as Eli Levitt, Grace's father, former history professor imprisoned for terrorism. Founder of the Friends.
- Kim Cattrall as Paige Katz, PR director of the Wild Palms group, Harry's former love and Kreutzer's fiancée.
- Ernie Hudson as Tommy Laszlo, Harry Wyckoff's childhood friend, an eccentric entrepreneur.
- Nick Mancuso as Tully Woiwode, infamous and popular painter and toast-of-the-town, Tommy's secret lover.
- Bebe Neuwirth as Tabba Schwartzkopf, Academy Award-winning actress who befriends Grace, and is part of the Wild Palms group.
- Aaron Michael Metchik as Peter, a street urchin with mysterious connections to Harry, Grace and the Fathers.
- Brad Dourif as Chickie Levitt, Eli Levitt's son from another relationship. Virtual reality boy genius and technology wizard.
- Charles Hallahan as Gavin Whitehope, Harry's associate at the Wild Palms group. Reformed alcoholic and Synthiotics devotee.
- Robert Morse as Chap Starfall, erstwhile pop star reduced to lounge singer status until the Wild Palms group revives him.
- Beata Pozniak as Tambor, the Wyckoffs' dutiful au-pair.
- Bob Gunton as Dr. Tobias Schenkl, Harry's psychiatrist.
- Rondi Reed as Eileen Whitehope, Gavin's wife, a "Lady-who-lunches" who also alerts Grace to a danger in her own home.
- Charles Rocket as Stitch Walken, a stand-up comedian who is also a surreptitious agent of the Friends.
- Eugene Lee as Lt. Bob Grindrod, a corrupt LAPD detective under contract to the Wild Palms group.
- François Chau as Hiro, Grace's childhood sweetheart from her years spent in Japan, and an enemy of Kreutzer.
- Monica Mikala as Deirdre Wyckoff, Harry and Grace's silent four-year-old daughter, who gets kidnapped and used as a pawn later on.

== Cameos ==
- Cyberpunk author William Gibson has a cameo appearance as himself. When the author is introduced as the man who invented the term Cyberspace, he remarks, "and they won't let me forget it".
- Wild Palms producer and film director Oliver Stone also has a cameo. In a fictitious interview he appears as himself and comments on the release of files pertinent to the assassination of John F. Kennedy, revealing that the theories in his film JFK were right.
- Wild Palms director Kathryn Bigelow has an uncredited cameo. She plays the character Maisy Woiwode.

== Production ==
Oliver Stone had originally planned to film Bruce Wagner's novel Force Majeure, but then decided to film Wagner's comic strip Wild Palms, published in Details magazine, instead: "It was so syncretic. It was such a fractured view of the world. Everything and anything could happen. Maybe your wife isn't your wife, maybe your kids aren't your kids. It really appealed to me." Wagner referred to his creation as "a sort of surreal diary […] a tone poem", set in an "Orwellian Los Angeles". ABC agreed to finance the project on a budget of $11 million, but, remembering the eventual decline of David Lynch's Twin Peaks, insisted that the series had "a complete story, with a beginning, a middle, and an end". Filming began in July 1992.

Actor James Belushi compared the series (among others) to the British TV serial The Prisoner, and stated: "It's very tough, very challenging—a lot of viewers probably won't dig it." Dana Delany suggested that viewers should "let it wash over you, enjoy each scene, and by the end it'll make sense". Robert Loggia compared it to the Elizabethan play The Duchess of Malfi and the ancient Greek tragedy Medea. ABC, bound to make sure that viewers wouldn't lose attention, had a supplemental book, The Wild Palms Reader, published and offered a telephone hotline with the show's initial run. These measures notwithstanding, Stone considered the atmosphere to be more important than the storyline.

William Gibson later stated that "while the mini-series fell drastically short of the serial, it did produce one admirably peculiar literary artifact, The Wild Palms Reader" (to which he contributed). Both Stone and Gibson called Wagner the creative force behind the series. The Los Angeles Times reported that although Stone was "touted heavily in the promotion for the miniseries as executive producer," he "served primarily as a script and casting consultant to Wagner once the project earned ABC's go-ahead." (Note: According to The New York Times, after a pitch meeting with ABC Stone left to shoot Heaven & Earth in southeast Asia, leaving Wagner to write and produce Wild Palms with minimal interference from the network.)

== Production design ==
The United States of the year 2007 as depicted in the series shows a strong influence of Japanese culture, such as in dress and interior and exterior design. Holograms of Miss Alabama and girl group The Supremes even bear Japanese facial features.

Other interior details show the influence of Scottish designer and architect Charles Rennie Mackintosh (1868–1928). Deliberately anachronistic elements include 1960s cars (like Studebaker police vehicles) and Edwardian fashion. Cerruti 1881 provided costumes.

The futuristic Los Angeles of the series is two environments, the "Wilderzone" inhabited by the city's poor and the world of its rich. Some of the "Wilderzone" scenes were shot in burned-out stores destroyed during the 1992 riots. Camera filters were also used to distinguish the two worlds: brown to make the destitute areas look smoggy, blue to make the elite characters seem to be breathing cleaner air.

== Supplements ==
=== Soundtrack album ===
In addition to Ryuichi Sakamoto's music score, a number of 1960s rock and pop songs and classical compositions could be heard in the series. On the 1993 released soundtrack album, the following songs were included besides Sakamoto's music:

- The Zombies: She's Not There
- Don Gardner & Dee Dee Ford: I Need Your Lovin'
- Frankie Valli: Can't Take My Eyes Off You
- Lou Christie: Lightnin' Strikes
- Mason Williams: Classical Gas

The following songs and compositions can be heard in the series but are not featured on the album:

- The Animals: The House of the Rising Sun
- Ludwig van Beethoven: Symphony No. 7 in A major, Op. 92, Second Movement
- The 5th Dimension: Wedding Bell Blues
- The Rolling Stones: Gimme Shelter
- The Rolling Stones: No Expectations
- The Supremes: Love Child
- Richard Wagner: Parsifal, Prelude

=== Books ===
A book, The Wild Palms Reader, was published by St. Martin's Press before the series aired. It included time lines, secret letters, and character biographies. ABC, concerned that viewers might get "hopelessly lost in the tangled story line", arranged for the primer to be published. It also included writing supposedly from the "world of the series". Contributors included:

- Norman Spinrad – sci-fi writer (Bug Jack Barron, The Iron Dream)
- Genesis P. Orridge (anonymous) – musician (Psychic TV, Throbbing Gristle)
- E. Howard Hunt – CIA officer involved in the Watergate Scandal, writer of spy/sci-fi novels
- William Gibson – sci-fi writer
- Brenda Laurel – virtual reality consultant on the mini-series
- Spain Rodriguez – 1960s underground comic artist (Trashman)
- Hans Moravec – scientist and writer in the artificial intelligence field

While the comic series was published in book form in Germany, the Wild Palms Reader was not. Instead, a novelization, written by German dime novel author Horst Friedrichs, was published under the title Wild Palms.

== Themes ==
ABC President Ted Harbert said to a journalist about the series, "Are we aware that it's about TV and mind control? Oh, absolutely. That subject is a particular favorite of mine."

== Reception ==
Reviews of the series were mixed. Bruce Wagner summed up the response in America: "the East Coast critics in the highbrow press loved it – in fact the New Yorker said it should have been shown on the big screen – but I've also spoken to people who couldn't follow it at all. Some were mesmerised, and some just turned off. Still, my electrician loved it, and he's from Bosnia."

The New York Times critic John J. O'Connor called Wild Palms a "truly wild six-hour mini-series" resembling "nothing so much as an acid freak's fantasy, drenched in paranoia and more pop-culture allusions than a Dennis Miller monologue." He described it as "rich and insinuating as a good theatrical film, albeit harder to follow" and concluded, "You wanted something different? Here it is. And Wild Palms also happens to be terrific."

Ken Tucker in Entertainment Weekly stated that "in its length, scope, sweeping visual tableaux, and over-the-top passion, Wild Palms is more like an opera than a TV show." Comparing it to David Lynch's Twin Peaks, he decided that "unlike Peaks, which started out brilliantly lucid and then rambled into incoherence, Palms sustains its length and adds layers of complexity to its characters. It also has something crucial that Peaks did not: a sense of humor about itself."

By contrast, Howard Rosenberg in The Los Angeles Times panned the show severely, calling it "this punishing six hours of gibberish... this cosmically pretentious, self-important, imitative goulash about technology incestuously screwing over the very humanity that created it... this bizarre, symbol-slogged piffle". He acknowledged "surface similarities" to Twin Peaks, but felt that a more valid comparison was to Lynch's disastrous Dune: "Although Frost and Lynch employed a myriad of confusing artistic and literary feints to tease and have fun with "Twin Peaks" viewers, even at its most obtuse that series dribbled out a seductive whodunit... that kept you hooked. "Wild Palms" offers nothing comparable to compensate for its suspenseless, unfathomably fragmented, laboriously eked-out plot."

Mary Harron of the British Independent suggested that viewers "forget about the message, and about what the rhino means. Wild Palms should be watched like opera; for its gorgeous images, its emotional set-pieces and its high style."

In The Times, Stephanie Billen wrote, "Despite over-the-top villains (Angie Dickinson as Harry's sinister mother-in-law), this is intelligent designer sci-fi which wonderfully exploits our technophobia", while David Flusfeder called it a "Gripping futuristic soap".

The Daily Telegraph was positive about Belushi's work in the lead role, and the technical aspects, but disliked the show's fundamental ethos: "By linking the television moguls of the future with a conspiracy to kidnap children, and with random and brutal arrests on the streets, the scenario spiralled out of control into one of those Big Brother fantasies in which all power is centralised and all evil emanates from a single source. There's nothing wrong with Big Brother fantasies per se, but they do need to be developed with a certain intellectual rigour if they are to carry conviction. All we got here was paranoia."

Readers of the British trade weekly Broadcast were even more negative, calling it one of the worst television shows ever exported by the U.S. to the U.K. It placed fourth on their list, exceeded only by Baywatch, The Anna Nicole Show and The Dukes of Hazzard. TV Guide also blasted it, offering the interpretation that Oliver Stone was condemning television while covertly lauding cinematic films.

== Ratings/Share ==
Night 1: #24, 12.3/20
Night 2: #45, 9.7/15
Night 3: #32, 11.0/19
Night 4: #42, 9.9/17

== Home media ==
- Wild Palms was released on VHS cassette in the UK by BBC in 1993, where it aired between November 15 and December 7 the same year.
- It was first released on CLV laserdisc in the U.S. in March 1995. The series was released on VHS on February 8, 2000 on two separate VHS tapes.
- It was released as a Region 4 DVD in Australia in 2004, a Region 1 DVD in the U.S. on October 4, 2005 by MGM Home Entertainment, and a Region 2 DVD in the UK in 2008.
- It was re-released as a two-disc DVD special edition and on blu-ray for the first time by Kino International on June 30, 2020.
