= I Am Greater than I Was =

2018 studio album by 21 Savage

I Am > I Was

Studio album by 21 Savage
- Released: December 21, 2018
- Genre: Hip-hop
- Length: 54:54
- Labels: Slaughter Gang; Epic
- Producers: 30 Roc; Axlfolie; Cardo; Cubeatz; Dave Sava6e; DJ Dahi; Doughboy Beatz; FKi 1st; Freek Van Workum; ItsNicklus; Kid Hazel; Louis Bell; Metro Boomin; Nils; Roselilah; Southside; Tiggi; TM88; Wheezy

21 Savage chronology
Without Warning (2017)	I Am > I Was (2018)	Savage Mode II (2020)

Singles from I Am > I Was
- 1. "A Lot" Released: January 8, 2019; 2. "Monster" Released: May 7, 2019

I Am > I Was (stylized in all lowercase, pronounced I Am Greater than I Was) is the second solo studio album by rapper 21 Savage, released on December 21, 2018. I Am > I Was features vocals by J. Cole, City Girls, Offset, Post Malone, Gunna, Lil Baby, Schoolboy Q, Project Pat, Childish Gambino, and Savage's cousin Young Nudy. The deluxe edition was released three days later, featuring one more song, which features an additional guest appearance from Travis Scott.

I Am > I Was was supported by two singles, "A Lot" and "Monster". The album received widespread acclaim from critics and was a commercial success, debuting atop the US Billboard 200 with 131,000 album-equivalent units, of which 18,000 were pure sales. It was nominated for Best Rap Album at the 2020 Grammy Awards.

== Background ==
21 Savage tweeted "12-7-18" in November, which led to speculation that the album would be released on that date. The tracklist was leaked by record producer Louis Bell via his Instagram story on December 13, 2018. 21 Savage later stated in his Instagram story that he was "sorry" because he "forgot" to release the album, but a later video stated it would be released on December 21.

== Cover art ==
21 Savage posted the cover art on Instagram on December 6, which features a blurred out image of himself, captioning the image with a number of goat emojis. Billboard called the cover art "cryptic".

== Singles ==
The album's lead single, "A Lot", was released to rhythmic and urban contemporary radio on January 8, 2019. The album's second single, "Monster", was sent to rhythmic contemporary radio on May 7, 2019.

== Critical reception ==
Professional ratings
Aggregate scores
Source	Rating
AnyDecentMusic?	7.2/10
Metacritic	81/100
Review scores
Source	Rating
AllMusic	4/5 stars
Consequence	B−
Crack	8/10
The Guardian	4/5 stars
Highsnobiety	4.5/5
HipHopDX	4.2/5
HotNewHipHop	88%
Pitchfork	7.8/10
RapReviews	6.5/10

I Am > I Was was met with widespread critical acclaim. At Metacritic, which assigns a normalized rating out of 100 to reviews from professional publications, the album received an average score of 81, based on six reviews. Aggregator AnyDecentMusic? gave it 7.2 out of 10, based on their assessment of the critical consensus.

Reviewing the album for Variety, A. D. Amorosi stated: "Despite all the high-profile guests, it's actually on the soulfully inventive "Ball w/o You", "Gun Smoke" and the sensual "Out for the Night"—which all feature 21 Savage on his own—that "i am > i was" is at its best and most dynamic." Eric Diep of HipHopDX said, "At 15 songs and 51 minutes long, it's an enjoyable listen with good pacing, filled with the right amount of vulnerability, heartache, menace, and savagery". Ben Beaumont-Thomas of The Guardian saying "There is a slight uptick in vocal musicality compared with his previous work. ... He has plenty of average lines—almost as offensive as the rightly controversial "Jewish money" lyric in ASMR is the weakness of "you get burned like toast" as a simile—but his catchy flows always make him magnetic, especially when paired with universally brilliant production from Metro Boomin, Kid Hazel and others".

Paul A. Thompson from Pitchfork stated, "i am > i was shatters the notion of 21 Savage as a specialist with a narrow purview and audience, and recasts him as a star in waiting, all without forcing him into unflattering contortions. It also cements him as a far more original stylist than other hopefuls from Atlanta". Consequence critic Michael Pementel said, "21 Savage's ability to express a variety of feelings allows the music to stand out at times and become more than a generic gangsta rap presentation. It's unfortunate, then, that the record finds itself held back by unfeeling and monotonous takes on issues like gun violence. Overall, i am > i was is a mixed bag of experience that offers enough solid tracks to keep fans latched on".

=== Year-end lists ===
Select year-end rankings of I Am > I Was
Publication	List	Rank	Ref.
HipHopDX	The Best Rap Albums of 2018	15	
Uproxx	The Best Albums of 2019	24	
Uproxx	The Best Hip-Hop Albums of 2019	9	

=== Industry awards ===
Awards and nominations for I Am > I Was
Year	Ceremony	Category	Result	Ref.
2020	Grammy Awards	Best Rap Album	Nominated	

== Commercial performance ==
I Am > I Was debuted at number 1 on the US Billboard 200 in the first chart issue of 2019, earning 131,000 album-equivalent units (including 18,000 pure album sales) in its first week, becoming 21 Savage's first US number 1 album. In its second week, the album remained at number 1, earning 65,000 units, down 51 percent from its debut week. In its third week, the album fell down to number 2 with 56,000 units (down 14 percent). A Boogie wit da Hoodie's Hoodie SZN surpassed him with 58,000 equivalent album units in the United States in the week ending January 10, 2019. On January 8, 2020, the album was certified platinum by the Recording Industry Association of America (RIAA) for combined sales and album-equivalent units of over a million units in the United States.

Following the release of I Am > I Was, nine songs debuted on the US Billboard Hot 100. It was led by "A Lot", which peaked at number 12 in its seventh week.

== Track listing ==
I Am > I Was track listing
No.	Title	Writer(s)	Producer(s)	Length
1.	"A Lot"	Shéyaa Abraham-Joseph; Jermaine Cole; Dacoury Natche; Anthony White; Shelia Young	DJ Dahi; J. White Did It^{[a]}	4:48
2.	"Break da Law"	Abraham-Joseph; Leland Wayne; Joshua Luellen; Bradley Brandon	Metro Boomin; Southside; Doughboy Beatz	2:57
3.	"A&T"	Abraham-Joseph; Trocon Roberts; Jocelyn Donald; Nija Charles; Kinta Cox; Paul Beauregard; Jordan Houston; Brandt Jones; Danell Stevens; Earl Stevens; Tenina Stevens; Marvin Whitemon; Delmar Lawrence	FKi 1st	3:32
4.	"Out for the Night"	Abraham-Joseph; Ahmar Bailey; Carlos Santana	Kid Hazel	2:17
5.	"Gun Smoke"	Abraham-Joseph; Bailey; Frederikus van Workum; Nicholas Luscombe	Kid Hazel; Freek Van Workum; ItsNicklus	2:47
6.	"1.5"	Abraham-Joseph; Kiari Cephus; Wesley Glass; Nils Noehden	Wheezy; Nils	2:28
7.	"All My Friends"	Abraham-Joseph; Austin Post; Louis Bell; Travis Galette	Bell	3:31
8.	"Can't Leave Without It"	Abraham-Joseph; Sergio Kitchens; Dominique Jones; Glass; Kevin Gomringer; Tim Gomringer	Wheezy; Cubeatz	3:25
9.	"ASMR"	Abraham-Joseph; Wayne; Bailey	Metro Boomin; Kid Hazel	2:51
10.	"Ball w/o You"	Abraham-Joseph; Bryan Simmons; Kenneth Smith Jr.; Tyshane Thompson; Ralphy London	TM88	3:15
11.	"Good Day"	Abraham-Joseph; Quincy Hanley; Patrick Houston; Ronald LaTour; Samuel Gloade; Lamont Porter; Brock Korsan; Thompson; Donald; Beauregard	Cardo; 30 Roc	4:02
12.	"Pad Lock"	Abraham-Joseph; Bailey; van Workum; Luscombe	Kid Hazel; Freek Van Workum; ItsNicklus	3:11
13.	"Monster"	Abraham-Joseph; Donald Glover; Natche; Axel Morgan; Jake Austin; Calvin Tarvin	DJ Dahi; Axlfolie; Dave Sava6e; Tiggi	3:53
14.	"Letter 2 My Momma"	Abraham-Joseph; Bailey	Kid Hazel	3:14
15.	"4L"	Abraham-Joseph; Quantavious Thomas; Roshwita Bacha; Bailey	Roselilah; Kid Hazel	4:48
Total length:				50:59

Deluxe bonus track
No.	Title	Writer(s)	Producer(s)	Length
16.	"Out for the Night, Pt. 2"	Abraham-Joseph; Jacques Webster II; Bailey; Santana	Kid Hazel; Boi-1da^{[b]}	3:55
Total length:				54:54

Notes

- All tracks are stylized in all lowercase
- ^{^[a]} signifies a co-producer
- ^{^[b]} signifies an uncredited co-producer

Sample credits

- "A Lot" contains a sample from "I Love You for All Seasons", written by Shelia Young, as performed by East of Underground.
- "A&T" contains a sample from "Azz & Tittiez", written by Paul Beauregard, Jordan Houston, Brandt Jones, Danell Stevens, Earl Stevens, Tenina Stevens, Marvin Whitemon and Delmar Lawrence, and performed by Hypnotize Camp Posse.
- Both versions of "Out for the Night" contain a sample from "Samba Pa Ti", written and performed by Carlos Santana.
- "Good Day" contains a sample from "Damn I'm Crazed", written by Paul Beauregard, and performed by DJ Paul and Lord Infamous.

== Personnel ==
Credits were adapted from Tidal.

Vocals

- 21 Savage – lead vocals
- J. Cole – vocals (track 1) (Note: Initial physical releases do not include Cole's verse on "A Lot".)
- City Girls – vocals (track 3)
- Offset – vocals (track 6)
- Post Malone – vocals (track 7)
- Gunna – vocals (track 8)
- Lil Baby – vocals (track 8)
- Schoolboy Q – vocals (track 11)
- Project Pat – vocals (track 11)
- Childish Gambino – vocals (track 13)
- Braylen Green – vocals (track 13)
- Hattori Williams – vocals (track 13)
- Mario Ricks Jr. – vocals (track 13)
- Peyton Eleazor – vocals (track 13)
- Young Nudy – vocals (track 15)
- Travis Scott – vocals (track 16)

Instrumentation

- Einer Bankz – guitar (tracks 4, 16)
- Darnell Stoxstell – bass (track 14)

Technical

- Mac Attkisson – recording (tracks 1–9, 11–16), mixing (tracks 10, 12, 15)
- David "Deyvid Blvd" Ford – recording (track 10)
- Riley Mackin – recording (track 13)
- Young Nudy – recording (track 15)
- Maddox "MaddMix" Chhim – mixing (tracks 1, 3–6, 8, 11, 13, 14, 16)
- Ethan Stevens – mixing (tracks 2, 9)
- Louis Bell – mixing (track 7), recording (track 7)
- Colin Leonard – mastering (all tracks)

== Charts ==
=== Weekly charts ===
Chart performance for I Am > I Was
Chart (2018–2019)	Peak position
Australian Albums (ARIA)	30
Austrian Albums (Ö3 Austria)	56
Belgian Albums (Ultratop Flanders)	42
Belgian Albums (Ultratop Wallonia)	93
Canadian Albums (Billboard)	3
Danish Albums (Hitlisten)	10
Dutch Albums (Album Top 100)	5
Finnish Albums (Suomen virallinen lista)	20
German Albums (Offizielle Top 100)	87
Irish Albums (IRMA)	30
Italian Albums (FIMI)	95
Latvian Albums (LAIPA)	3
New Zealand Albums (RMNZ)	23
Norwegian Albums (VG-lista)	7
Swedish Albums (Sverigetopplistan)	13
Swiss Albums (Schweizer Hitparade)	33
UK Albums (Official Charts)	33
US Billboard 200	1
US Top R&B/Hip-Hop Albums (Billboard)	1

=== Year-end charts ===
2019 year-end chart performance for I Am > I Was
Chart (2019)	Position
Canadian Albums (Billboard)	39
Icelandic Albums (Plötutíóindi)	96
US Billboard 200	18
US Top R&B/Hip-Hop Albums (Billboard)	10

2023 year-end chart performance for I Am > I Was
Chart (2023)	Position
US Billboard 200	196

=== Decade-end charts ===
Decade-end chart performance for I Am > I Was
Chart (2010–2019)	Position
US Billboard 200	134

== Certifications ==
Certifications for I Am > I Was
Region	Certification	Certified units/sales
Canada (Music Canada)	2× Platinum	160,000^{‡}
Denmark (IFPI Danmark)	Gold	10,000^{‡}
New Zealand (RMNZ)	Platinum	15,000^{‡}
Poland (ZPAV)	Gold	10,000^{‡}
United Kingdom (BPI)	Gold	100,000^{‡}
United States (RIAA)	Platinum	1,000,000^{‡}
^{‡} Sales+streaming figures based on certification alone.

== Release history ==
Release dates and formats for I Am > I Was
Region	Date	Label(s)	Format(s)	Edition	Ref.
Various	December 21, 2018	Slaughter Gang; Epic	CD; digital download; streaming	Standard	
Various	December 24, 2018	Slaughter Gang; Epic	CD; digital download; streaming	Deluxe	
Various	March 1, 2019	Slaughter Gang; Epic	Vinyl	Standard	
Various	March 8, 2019	Slaughter Gang; Epic	Vinyl	Deluxe	
