= But It's Alright (album) =

Studio album by J.J. Jackson
- Released: 1967
- Genre: Soul-jazz
- Label: Calla
- Producer: Lew Futterman

J.J. Jackson chronology
But It's Alright (1967)	The Great J.J. Jackson (1969)

But It's Alright is the first studio album by American singer J. J. Jackson, released on Calla Records in 1967.

== History and critical reception ==
The album was released following the success of Jackson's single, "But It's Alright", in 1966. Apart from the title song, which was recorded in England, the balance of the record was recorded in New York City. The album was favorably reviewed, with Jackson being described as having a "live-wire voice" and the band as "kicking up a storm" on what is considered to be "a bit of a lost gem". The album is notable as containing a rare cover version of an early Robbie Robertson song, "The Stones I Throw", originally recorded in 1965 by Levon and the Hawks.

In 1996, the album was re-released on CD in the United Kingdom, by See For Miles Records. It was also re-released in 2005 in the United States, by Collectables Records.

== Track listing ==
- A1 "But It's Alright" (Jackson, Tubbs)
- A2 "Try Me" (King, Jackson, McCorkle)
- A3 That Ain't Right (Foster, Jessup)
- A4 You've Got Me Dizzy (Reed)
- A5 A Change Is Gonna Come (Cooke)
- A6 I Dig Girls (King)
- B1 "Come See Me" (Jackson, Tubbs, Barnes)
- B2 "The Stones That I Throw" (Robertson)
- B3 Give Me Back The Love (Paul, Green, King)
- B4 "Ain't Too Proud to Beg" (Holland, Whitfield)
- B5 "Love Is a Hurting Thing" (Raleigh, Linden)
- B6 Boogaloo Baby (Lewis, Jackson)
- B7 Let It Out (Barkan, Meltzer)

== Credits ==
- Producer: Lew Futterman
- Arranger: J.J. Jackson
- Cover design: John Murello
- Cover photography: Mario Astorta
