= The Greatest Little Soul Band in the Land =

Studio album by J.J. Jackson
- Released: 1969
- Genre: Soul-jazz
- Label: Congress CS-7000
- Producer: Lew Futterman

J.J. Jackson chronology
The Great J.J. Jackson (1969)	The Greatest Little Soul Band in the Land (1969)	J.J. Jackson's Dilemma (1970)

Professional ratings
Review scores
Source	Rating
Allmusic	4/5 stars

The Greatest Little Soul Band in the Land is J.J. Jackson's third album. The album was released in 1969 on the Congress label, which had been relaunched that year by MCA as a subsidiary of Uni Records. The single released from the album was "Fat, Black and Together", which was co-written by Jackson and Al Stewart. One reviewer described the single as" a truly heavyweight funk jam that is the highlight of this gritty, soulful LP".

The album is notable as featuring some of the same British musicians who had backed Jackson on his 1966 hit, "But It's Alright", including Dick Morrissey and Terry Smith, and was recorded contemporaneous to Jackson becoming a permanent resident of England. In the liner notes, the album is described as being Jackson's attempt to fuse soul music and jazz music, with the album being critically described as one where Jackson "achieves a sound recalling Ray Charles' most deeply funky outings, complete with big band-inspired horn arrangements". The centerpiece of the album is considered to be "Jackson's raw, impassioned vocals". Another described the album as containing "tons of horns and great singing here, plus 60's progressive moves, such as weaving walking bass interludes into the tracks. There is no filler on here." The album is also notable for containing "Tenement Halls', a song co-written by Scott Fagan, a psych-folk artist rediscovered in the 2000s.

== Track listing ==
1. "Tobacco Road" (John D. Loudermilk)
2. "Tenement Halls" (Scott Fagan–Joseph M. Kookoolis)
3. "Something for My People" (Jackson)
4. "In the Same Old Way" (Jackson, Barnes)
5. "A Change Is Gonna Come" (Sam Cooke)
6. "Fat, Black and Together" (Jackson, Stewart)
7. "Win Lose Or Draw" (Ousley)
8. "That's Woman Loving Her Man" (Jackson, Barnes)

== Personnel ==
- J.J. Jackson - vocals, piano, percussion and arrangements
- Dick Morrissey - tenor saxophone
- Stu Hamer - trumpet
- Terry Smith - guitar
- Larry Steele - bass
- Ronnie Stephenson - drums
- Jeff Whittaker - conga
- John Stanley Marshall - drums
- Rico Rodriguez - trombone
- Roy Edwards - trumpet
- Bill Eyden - drums
- Brian Henderson - organ, keyboards
- Terry Jenkins - drums
