= Let Me Down Easy (Bettye LaVette song) =

Single by Bettye LaVette
- B-side: "What I Don't Know (Won't Hurt Me)"
- Released: 1965
- Genre: Soul, R&B
- Length: 2:50
- Label: Calla
- Songwriter(s): Wrecia Holloway
- Producer(s): Don Gardner

Bettye LaVette singles chronology
"Witchcraft in the Air" (1963)	"Let Me Down Easy" (1965)	"I Feel Good All Over" (1965)

"Let Me Down Easy" is a song that was first recorded in 1965 by American soul singer Bettye LaVette. It was written by Dee Dee Ford (née Wrecia Mae Ford; 1936–1972), who copyrighted in 1965 under her married name, Wrecia Holloway. (Note: Wrecia Ford, in March 1955, at Newark, New Jersey, married Calvin Holloway. (Ancestry.com)) The original recording by LaVette, released as a single by Calla Records, peaked at number 20 on the Billboard Hot Rhythm and Blues Singles chart.

== Composition and release ==
Dee Dee Ford, a singer who teamed up with Don Gardner on the top-20 single "I Need Your Lovin'" in 1962, wrote "Let Me Down Easy" three years later using her real name Wrecia Holloway. The song, a torch ballad, was performed by Bettye LaVette, arranged by Dale Warren, and produced by Gardner. New York independent label Calla Records released the track as a single and it reached number 20 on the Billboard Hot Rhythm and Blues Singles chart. LaVette performed it on a 1965 episode of Shindig! and on the 2012/13 Hootenanny show presented by Jools Holland.

== Critical reception ==
A 1965 Billboard review of "Let Me Down Easy" complimented the song's "driving beat" and LaVette's "outstanding wailing vocal performance." In 2006, music journalist Bill Friskics-Warren described it as "a gloriously anguished record aggravated by nagging syncopation, astringent strings, and a stinging blues guitar break". Ladies of Soul author David Freeland wrote that "the record featured her most soulful performance to date–miles away from the youthful impetuosity of 'My Man', recorded just three years earlier. The fade, in which she repeatedly shouted 'Please! Please!' was particularly effective." Freeland added that the song highlighted LaVette's "blistering intensity modulated by moments of deep, heartfelt reflection." Allmusic's Jason Ankeny remarked that the song is "a staple of the Northern soul scene and the countless anthologies it's yielded", and said it is LaVette's "masterpiece, a blisteringly poignant requiem for romance gone bad distinguished by its unique, tangolike rhythm and sweeping string arrangement." Holly Gleason of Relix called it a "seminal" song "which many consider to be one of the great soul sides of all time". In a 2013 Metro Times article, writer Brett Callwood said of the song: "LaVette’s voice soars one minute and purrs the next, each word practically dripping off her tongue. Performed live, the song sounds better today than it ever did".

== Other versions ==
LaVette re-recorded "Let Me Down Easy" in 1969 for Karen Records, a small New York independent label. The remade version, which incorporated funk guitars similar to those on early Funkadelic records, was released as a single. The song is a highlight of her live shows, as featured in the album Let Me Down Easy In Concert, recorded in Germany in 1999. It has also been covered by The Spencer Davis Group on The Second Album (1966), Inez and Charlie Foxx on At Memphis & More (1973), Paloma Faith on Fall to Grace (2012). and Paolo Nutini on Caustic Love (2014).

On February 8, 2022, electronic music duo ODESZA released “The Last Goodbye”, an electropop track which samples vocals from “Let Me Down Easy.”

== Chart performance ==
Chart (1965)	Peak position
U.S. Billboard Hot 100	103
U.S. Hot Rhythm and Blues Singles (Billboard)	20
U.S. Cash Box Top 100	90

== Selected audio and video ==
- LaVette – video – 51 years after the original recording, performed at Jazzwoche Burghausen; 2016

== Bibliography ==
=== Discography ===
1. Bettye LaVette
  - 1965: Calla 102; "Let Me Down Easy" / "What I Don't Know Won't Hurt Me" at Discogs (list of releases) (master 547643)
  - 1965: Calla 102; "Let Me Down Easy" / "What I Don't Know Won't Hurt Me" at Discogs (release 1153787)
