= Like an Open Door =

Single by The Fuzz

from the album The Fuzz
- B-side: "Leave It All Behind Me"
- Released: June 1971
- Genre: Soul
- Length: 2:27
- Label: Calla
- Songwriter(s): Sheila Young
- Producer(s): Carr-Cee Productions

The Fuzz singles chronology
"I Love You for All Seasons" (1970)	"Like an Open Door" (1971)	"I'm So Glad" (1971)

"Like an Open Door" is a song written by Sheila Young and performed by The Fuzz. It reached #14 on the U.S. R&B chart and #77 on the Billboard Hot 100 in 1971. The song was featured on their 1971 album, The Fuzz.

The song was produced by Carr-Cee Productions.
