= Stu Hamer =

British jazz trumpeter (1934–2014)

John Stuart Hamer (8 October 1934 – 7 December 2014) was a British jazz trumpeter. Following an illness in the late 1980s, he switched to the piano and concentrated on composition.

The brother of musicians George and Ian Hamer, the three sons of legendary Grafton Rooms’ 1930s bandleader Wilf Hamer would all play later in the same band, then led by their mother.

In 1957 he started playing regularly in Germany, first with Lars Werner and then later with Putte Wickman, Povel Ramel and George Russell’s Emanon Big Band. In 1959, he was in the trumpet section with Benny Bailey and George Ernzst in Oscar Pettiford's All Stars band, which also featured Albert Mangelsdorff and drummer Joe Harris.

Back in the UK, in the early 1960s Hamer led a quintet featuring Tony Archer and Harold McNair.

In 1966, he was in the Ronnie Ross Big Band which was recorded live for NDR.

In 1968, he played in the trumpet sections, alongside Dizzy Reece, of two line-ups led by Dizzy Gillespie, the Dizzy Gillespie Reunion Big Band in Berlin, and Dizzy Gillespie and his Orchestra. Around that time he was also a member of the Joe Harriott Quintet, with Pat Smythe, Coleridge Goode, and Phil Seamen.

He later focused on African music, living for some time in Africa and performing in London with African musicians including Ghanaian (UK based) band Hi-Life International.

Hamer died from complications of a fall on 7 December 2014, at the age of 80.

== Discography ==
- 1966: Old Friends & New Faces from Britain – Ronnie Ross Big Band
- 1967: Joe Harriott Swings High (Melodisc)
- 1968: Trumpet A'Gogo – Hamer and Phil Parker (trumpets), David Moses (bass guitar); Chick Webb; Graham Stansfield (organ); Mike Gibbs (Saga FID 2114)
- 1969: The Greatest Little Soul Band in the Land - JJ Jackson
