= The Stones I Throw =

- 1965 American single sleeve.

Single by Levon and the Hawks
- B-side: "He Don't Love You (And He'll Break Your Heart)"
- Released: 1965
- Recorded: September 1965
- Genre: Rock
- Length: 3:45
- Label: Atco Records
- Songwriter: Robbie Robertson
- Producer: Eddie Heller

Levon and the Hawks singles chronology
"The Stones I Throw" (1965)	"Go Go, Liza Jane/He Don't Love You" (1968)

"The Stones I Throw (Will Free All Men)" is a single by Levon and the Hawks, released in 1965 on Atco Records. It was their first release under this name, following their previous single under the name Canadian Squires. Seemingly a comment by Robbie Robertson in favor of the Civil Rights Movement, the song is carried by Garth Hudson's organ, and is far less rooted in the heavy R&B stylings of the group's other three single sides. It is the link between their days with Ronnie Hawkins and the group's breakout 1968 LP, Music from Big Pink. In December, 1965 the song reached #22 on the CHUM Chart.

== Cover versions ==
The song was covered by J.J. Jackson and included on his debut album released in 1967, and by the group Ocean, who included it on their 1970 debut album, Put Your Hand in the Hand.

== Personnel ==
The Band

- Rick Danko - bass, vocals
- Levon Helm - drums, vocals
- Garth Hudson - organ
- Richard Manuel - piano, vocals
- Jaime Robbie Robertson - guitar, harmonica

Technical

- Henry Glover - producer
- Phil Ramone - engineer
