= The Fuzz (album) =

Studio album by The Fuzz
- Released: 1971
- Genre: Soul
- Length: 33:18
- Label: Calla
- Producer: Carr-Cee Productions

Singles from The Fuzz
- 1. "I Love You for All Seasons"/"I Love You for All Seasons (instrumental)" Released: December 1970; 2. "Like an Open Door"/"Leave It All Behind Me" Released: June 1971; 3. "I'm So Glad"/"All About Love" Released: September 1971

Professional ratings
Review scores
Source	Rating
Allmusic	4/5 stars

The Fuzz is the only album by The Fuzz and was released in 1971. It reached #43 on the US R&B album chart and #196 on the Billboard 200 chart.

The album featured three singles: "I Love You for All Seasons", which reached #10 on the R&B chart, "Like an Open Door", which reached #14, and "I'm So Glad" which reached #35.

== Track listing ==
All songs written by Sheila Young except where noted.

1. "I Think I Got the Making of a True Love Affair" (Prelude) – 2:32
2. "I Think I Got the Making of a True Love Affair" (Joe Tate/Young) – 2:29
3. "I'm So Glad" (Prelude) – 0:42
4. "I'm So Glad" (Tate/Young) – 2:41
5. "All About Love" (Prelude) – 0:45
6. "All About Love" (Tate/Young) – 2:53
7. "It's All Over" (Prelude) – 0:44
8. "It's All Over" – 3:33
9. "Like an Open Door" – 2:27
10. "Search Your Mind" (Matthew Allen) – 3:05
11. "Leave It All Behind Me" – 3:00
12. "Ooh Baby Baby" (Smokey Robinson/Warren Moore) – 5:32
13. "I Love You for All Seasons" – 2:55

== Personnel ==
- Carr-Cee Productions – producer
- Joe Tate – arranger

== Charts ==
Chart (1971)	Peak position
US R&B	43
US Pop	196

Singles

Year	Single	Chart	Position
1971	"I Love You for All Seasons"	US R&B	10
1971	"I Love You for All Seasons"	US Pop	21
1971	"Like an Open Door"	US R&B	14
1971	"Like an Open Door"	US Pop	77
1971	"I'm So Glad"	US R&B	35
1971	"I'm So Glad"	US Pop	95
