= Bettye LaVette =

American soul singer (born 1946)

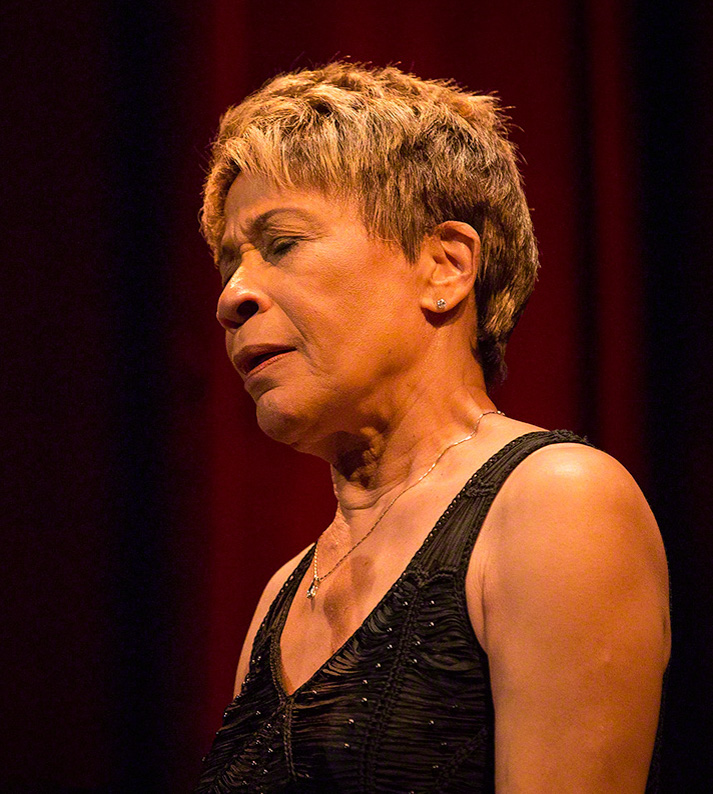
- LaVette at Cosmopolite Scene in Oslo in 2016

Background information
- Born: Betty Jo Haskins; January 29, 1946 (age 80); Muskegon, Michigan, U.S.
- Genres: Soul, blues, R&B, funk, Rock, country, Americana, gospel
- Occupations: Singer, entertainer
- Years active: 1962–present
- Labels: Atlantic, Calla, Silver Fox, Atco, Motown, Epic, Charly, Munich, Blues Express, Anti-, Verve
- Website: bettyelavette.com

Bettye LaVette (born Betty Jo Haskins, January 29, 1946) is an American soul singer who made her first record at sixteen, but achieved only intermittent fame until 2005, when her album I've Got My Own Hell to Raise was released to widespread critical acclaim, and was named on many critics' "Best of 2005" lists. Her next album, The Scene of the Crime, debuted at number one on Billboard's Top Blues Albums chart and was nominated for Best Contemporary Blues Album at the 2008 Grammy Awards. She received the Legacy of Americana Lifetime Achievement Award at the 2023 Americana Music Honors & Awards.

LaVette's eclectic musical style combines elements of soul, blues, rock and roll, funk, gospel, and country music. In 2020, she was inducted into the Blues Hall of Fame.

== Life and career ==
LaVette was born in Muskegon, Michigan, and raised in Detroit. Unlike many of her contemporaries, she did not begin singing in the church, but in her parents' living room, singing R&B and country and western music. She was raised as a Catholic.

She was signed by Johnnie Mae Matthews, a local record producer. In 1962, aged sixteen, she recorded a single, "My Man – He's a Lovin' Man", with Matthews: the disc was credited to Betty LaVett, the surname being "borrowed" from Sherma Lavette Anderson, the singer's friend who had introduced her to Matthews. Picked up by Atlantic Records, LaVette's disc became a major R&B hit over the fall and winter of 1963–64 – eventually reaching the R&B Top Ten – resulting in LaVette touring with such Atlantic Records R&B hitmakers as Clyde McPhatter, Ben E. King, Barbara Lynn, and rising star Otis Redding.

After two overlooked single releases in 1963 and 1964, LaVette in 1965 returned to the R&B charts with "Let Me Down Easy" on Calla Records, her first release to be credited to Betty LaVette: the spelling of the singer's first name as Bettye would date from her 1977 Bubbling Brown Sugar gig. Though only a peripheral success with an R&B chart peak of No. 48, "Let Me Down Easy" afforded LaVette sufficient cachet to briefly tour with The James Brown Revue. After recording several singles for local Detroit labels, LaVette signed to the Silver Fox label in 1969. She cut a handful of tracks, including two Top 40 R&B hits: "He Made A Woman Out Of Me" and "Do Your Duty". The Memphis studio musicians on these recordings have since become known as The Dixie Flyers. In 1972, she signed once again with Atlantic/Atco. She was sent to Muscle Shoals Sound Studio in Alabama to record what was to be her first album. Titled Child of the Seventies, it was produced by Brad Shapiro and featured the Muscle Shoals Rhythm Section, now known as The Swampers, but Atco chose not to issue the album.

The mid-1970s saw a brief stint and two 45s with Epic, and in 1978 LaVette released the disco smash on West End Records "Doin' The Best That I Can". In 1982, she was signed by her hometown label, Motown, and sent to Nashville to record. The resulting LP (her first album actually issued), titled Tell Me A Lie, was produced by Steve Buckingham. The first single, "Right In The Middle (Of Falling In Love)", hit the R&B Top 40. She briefly gave up recording for a six-year run in the Broadway smash Bubbling Brown Sugar, appearing alongside Honi Coles and Cab Calloway.

After LaVette had played her personal mono recordings of Child of the Seventies for Gilles Petard, a French soul music collector, he sought the master recordings at Atlantic, whose personnel had previously thought they had been lost in a fire some years back. In 1999, he finally discovered the masters and then licensed the album from Atlantic and released it in 2000 as Souvenirs on his Art and Soul label. At the same time, Let Me Down Easy – Live in Concert was issued by the Dutch Munich label. Both albums sparked a renewed interest in LaVette and in 2003, A Woman Like Me (produced by Dennis Walker) was released. The CD won the 2004 W. C. Handy Award for "Comeback Blues Album of the Year". In an interview, LaVette identified A Woman Like Me as the first album in the second phase of her career and said her 2012 autobiography was named after the album.

After she was signed to The Rosebud Agency for live bookings, Rosebud president Mike Kappus brought her to the attention of Anti- president Andy Kaulkin. Upon seeing LaVette perform, Kaulkin signed her to a three-record deal. For the first project, he paired her with Joe Henry, and suggested an album of songs written entirely by women. The resulting CD, I've Got My Own Hell to Raise, was on many critics' "Best of 2005" lists. The title is taken from the lyrics of Fiona Apple's 1996 hit "Sleep to Dream", which is covered on the album. (Other notable songwriters on the album were Aimee Mann, Sinéad O'Connor, Lucinda Williams, Joan Armatrading, and Dolly Parton.) The album was released by ANTI- and produced by Joe Henry.

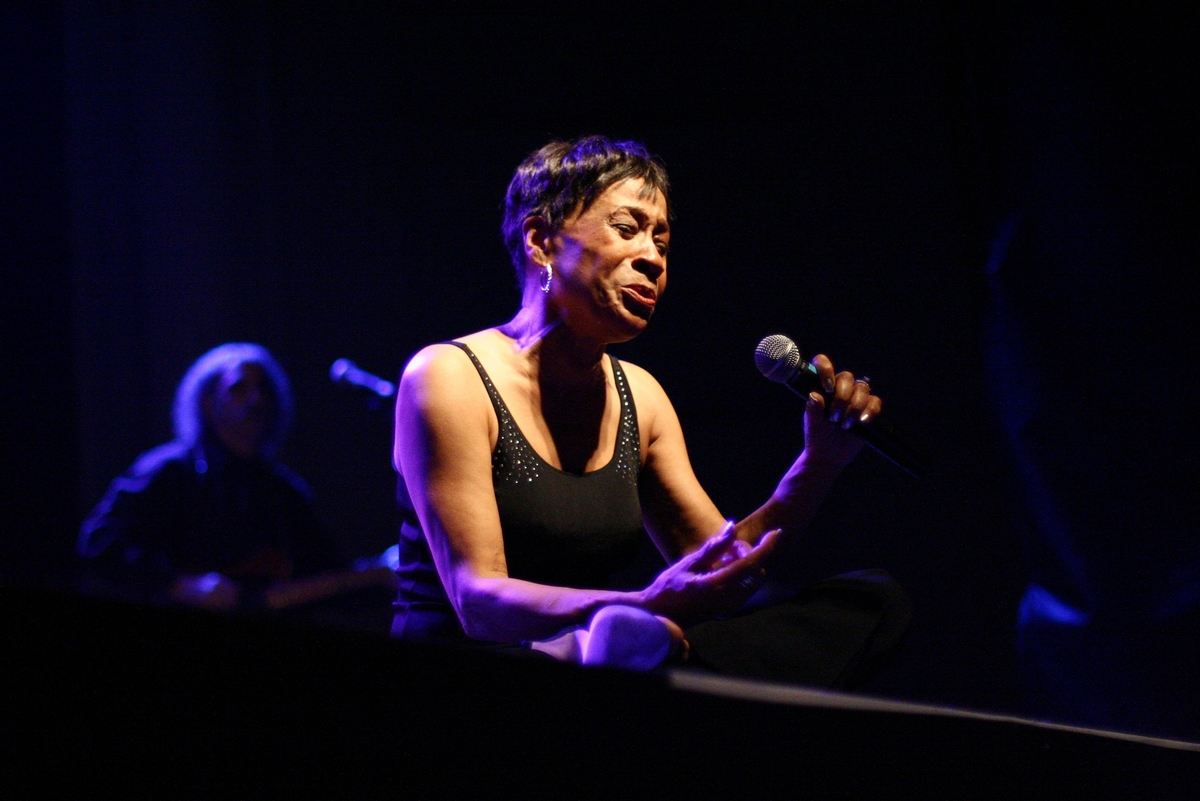
LaVette performing in Leuven, Belgium, in 2006

In 2006, capitalizing on the success of I've Got My Own Hell To Raise and the reviews of her live shows, Child of the Seventies was reissued by Rhino Handmade with some previously unreleased tracks. The album was met with critical acclaim. Varèse Sarabande then issued Take Another Little Piece of My Heart, a CD containing all of the songs that she cut for Silver Fox and SSS International in 1969 and 1970. The CD included three unreleased tracks, as well as two duets with Hank Ballard.

In 2006, LaVette received a "Pioneer Award" from the Rhythm and Blues Foundation.

Her 2007 album, The Scene of the Crime, was mostly recorded at FAME Studios in Muscle Shoals, Alabama, with alt rockers Drive-By Truckers. The Scene of the Crime was nominated for a Grammy Award for "Best Contemporary Blues Album" and landed on numerous "Best of 2007" lists. LaVette talked about her experiences at Muscle Shoals Sound and FAME in an interview conducted by Edd Hurt in September 2007. Drive-By Truckers frontman Patterson Hood produced the album together with LaVette. The album also features one song co-written by LaVette and Patterson Hood.

In 2008, she received a Blues Music Award for "Best Contemporary Female Blues Singer". Also in 2008, Reel Music re-issued on CD her Motown LP, Tell Me A Lie. The album contained the original cover design that was not used when the LP was released.

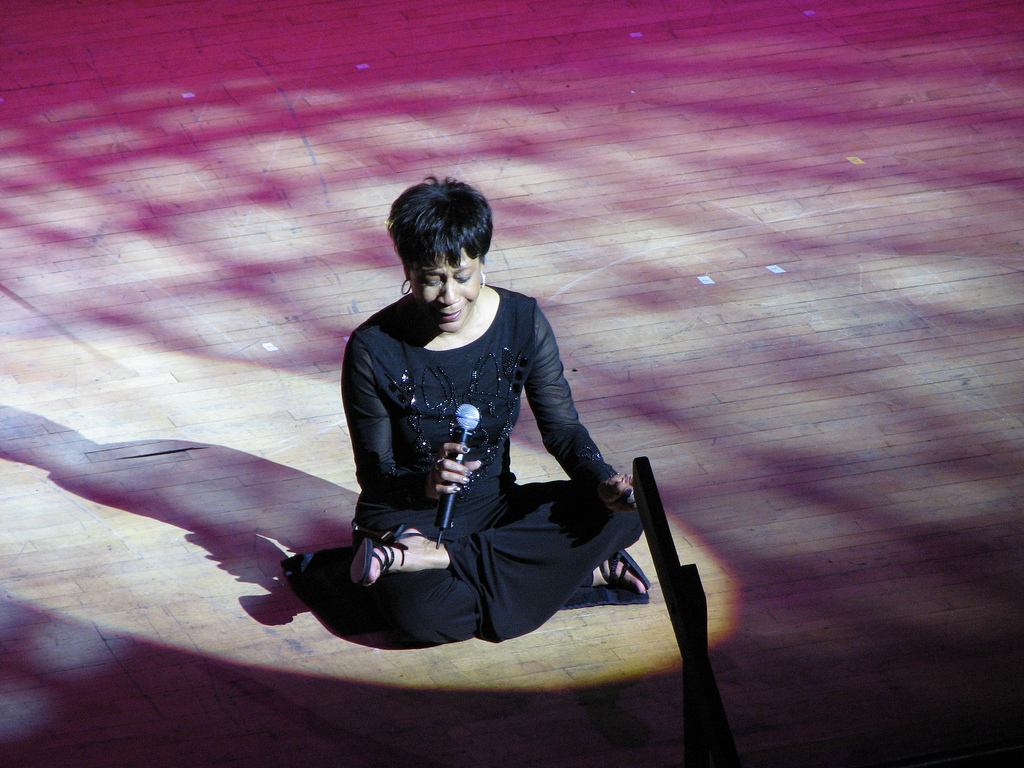
LaVette, live at Massey Hall in Toronto

In December 2008 at the Kennedy Center Honors, LaVette sang her version of 1973's "Love, Reign o'er Me" in tribute to Roger Daltrey and Pete Townshend of The Who, who were among the year's honorees. The performance was widely considered one of the event's highlights.

On January 18, 2009, at the We Are One: The Obama Inaugural Celebration at the Lincoln Memorial she performed a duet of Sam Cooke's 1964 song "A Change Is Gonna Come" with Jon Bon Jovi. In April 2009, she shared the stage with Sir Paul McCartney and Ringo Starr at Radio City Music Hall for the David Lynch Foundation's "Change Begins Within" benefit concert promoting teaching Transcendental Meditation to children in inner city schools. In 2009 Sundazed released on CD the album Do Your Duty, which consisted of her eleven solo tracks cut for Silver Fox and SSS International. In June 2009 a six-song EP, Change Is Gonna Come Sessions, was released as a download only.

In 2010, LaVette released Interpretations: The British Rock Songbook, which included unique arrangements and performances of classic songs by artists including The Beatles, The Rolling Stones, The Animals, and Pink Floyd. Included is the complete unedited version of her Kennedy Center Honors performance of The Who's "Love, Reign O'er Me". The CD was critically acclaimed and nominated for a Grammy Award for Best Contemporary Blues Album. She has appeared on National Public Radio's Mountain Stage, World Cafe, All Things Considered and Wait Wait... Don't Tell Me!. She has appeared in a Mississippi Public Broadcasting series, Blues Divas, and is in a film of the same name, both produced by Robert Mugge. She has also appeared on Late Night with David Letterman, Conan, The Late Late Show with Craig Ferguson, The Tonight Show with Jay Leno, Austin City Limits, The Today Show, Good Morning America, and Live from the Artists Den. LaVette also joined the 9th 10th and 11th annual Independent Music Awards judging panel to assist independent musicians' careers.

LaVette contributed a cover of "Most of the Time" for the album Chimes of Freedom: The Songs of Bob Dylan Honoring 50 Years of Amnesty International. On December 31, 2012, she appeared in the UK on BBC Two's Jools Holland Annual Hootenanny. In 2013 and 2014, LaVette was nominated for a Blues Music Award in the "Contemporary Blues Female Artist" category.

LaVette's album Worthy was nominated for a Grammy Award in 2016 for Best Blues Album.

In 2016, LaVette won a Blues Music Award as the Soul Blues Female Artist of the Year.

On March 6, 2017, she took part in a benefit concert at Carnegie Hall celebrating the music of Aretha Franklin, whom she has known since 1962. Lavette performed a rendition of the song "Ain't No Way", which she mentioned was written by Carolyn Franklin, her younger sister, with whom Bettye was friends.

In 2017, LaVette appeared in the award-winning documentary film The American Epic Sessions. The film featured an interview between director Bernard MacMahon and LaVette in which they discussed her "heartfelt recollections of being pushed away from early blues as 'Uncle Tomish' in the '60s." Following the interview, LaVette recorded "Nobody's Dirt Business", a song by early blues musician Frank Stokes, direct-to-disc on the first electrical sound recording system from the 1920s. A soundtrack for the film, entitled Music from The American Epic Sessions, also featured a second song she recorded for the film, "When I Woke Up This Morning", which L. Kent Wolgamott in the Lincoln Journal Star praised as "among its highlights."

In 2018, Bettye LaVette was inducted into the Michigan Rock and Roll Legends Hall of Fame.

Her 2018 album Things Have Changed, an album of all Bob Dylan songs, was nominated for Best Americana Album and the song "Don't Fall Apart On Me Tonight" was nominated for Best Traditional R&B Performance at the 61st Annual Grammy Awards.

In May 2020, LaVette garnered another Blues Music Award in the "Soul Blues Female Artist of the Year" category. The same year, LaVette was inducted into the Blues Hall of Fame. On August 28, 2020, she released a new studio album, Blackbirds, which is an album of songs by women from the 1950s who were the "bridge she came across on". Blackbirds was nominated for Best Contemporary Blues Album at the 63rd Annual Grammy Awards.

In 2021, Bettye again received the Blues Music Award for "Soul Blues Female Artist of the Year".

On February 8, 2022, LaVette's vocals from "Let Me Down Easy" were sampled as the focal point for Odesza's song, "The Last Goodbye".

== Personal life ==
LaVette is married to Kevin Kiley, a recorded music and antiques dealer who is also a singer and musician. They live in West Orange, New Jersey.

== Discography ==
=== Albums ===
Album	Year	Label	Media
Tell Me a Lie	1982; 2008	Motown; Reel Music	LP, CD
Not Gonna Happen Twice	1990	Motor CIty	Import CD
A Woman Like Me	2003	Blues Express	CD
I've Got My Own Hell to Raise	2005	Anti-, DBK Works	CD, LP
The Scene of the Crime	2007	Anti-	CD, LP
A Change Is Gonna Come Sessions	2009	Anti-	Digital download-only EP
Interpretations: The British Rock Songbook	2010	Anti-	CD
Thankful n' Thoughtful	2012	Anti-	CD, LP
Worthy	2015	Cherry Red	CD, download, streaming
Things Have Changed	2018	Verve	CD, LP, download, streaming
Blackbirds	2020	Verve	CD, LP, download, streaming
LaVette!	2023	Jay-Vee	CD, LP, download, streaming

=== Compilations ===
Album	Year	Label	Notes
Nearer to You: The SSS Recordings	1990	Charly	
The Very Best of the Motor City Recordings	1996	Motor City	Reissued as Danger, Heartbreak, Dead Ahead – The Best Of
Bluesoul Belles: The Complete Cala, Port and Roulette Recordings	1999, 2005	West Side, Stateside	with Carol Fran
Souvenirs	2000	Art & Soul	Original previously unreleased Atco LP from 1973
Let Me Down Easy in Concert	2000	Munich Records	
Take Another Little Piece of My Heart: The Classic Late '60s Memphis Recordings with The Dixie Flyers	2006	Varese Sarabande	Duplicates tracks from Nearer to You
Child of the Seventies: The Complete Atlantic/Atco Recordings	2006	Rhino Handmade	
Do Your Duty: The Complete Silver Fox/SSS Recordings	2006, 2009	Sundazed (LP, CD)	Duplicates tracks from Nearer to You

=== Compilation appearances ===
Title	Year	Album	Artists	Label
"Real Real Gone"	2003	Vanthology: A Tribute to Van Morrison	Various artists	Evidence
"Night Time Is the Right Time" "Tailfeather Finale"	2005	Get in the Groove – Live	Various artists	Norton
"What's Happening Brother"	2006	What's Going On	The Dirty Dozen Brass Band	Shout! Factory
"Streets of Philadelphia"	2007	Song of America	Various artists	Thirty Tigers
"Nobody's Dirty Business" "When I Woke Up This Morning"	2017	Music from The American Epic Sessions: Original Motion Picture Soundtrack	Various artists	Lo-Max, Columbia, Third Man

=== Singles ===
Title	Year	Label	Catalog Number	Notes
"My Man – He's a Lovin' Man" / "Shut Your Mouth"	1962	Atlantic	2160	No. 7 R&B
"You'll Never Change" / "Here I Am"	1963	Atlantic	2198	
"Witchcraft in the Air" / "You Killed the Love"	1963	LuPine	123	
"(Happiness Will Cost You) One Thin Dime"	1964	Scepter		unreleased
"Let Me Down Easy" / "What I Don't Know (Won't Hurt Me)"	1965	Calla	102	No. 20 R&B
"I Feel Good All Over" / "Only Your Love Can Save Me"	1965	Calla	104	
"Cry Me a River"	1965	Calla		unreleased
"She Don't Love You Like I Love You"	1965	Calla		unreleased
"I'm Just a Fool for You" / "Stand Up Like a Man"	1966	Calla	106	
"I'm Holding On" / "Tears in Vain"	1966	Big Wheel	1969	
"Almost" / "Love Makes the World Go Round"	1968	Karen	1540	
"Get Away" / "What Condition My Condition Is In"	1968	Karen	1544	
"A Little Help from My Friends" / "Hey Love"	1969	Karen	1545	
"Let Me Down Easy" / "Ticket to the Moon"	1969	Karen	1548	
"He Made a Woman Out of Me" / "Nearer to You"	1969	Silver Fox	17	No. 25 R&B
"Do Your Duty" / "Love's Made a Fool Out of Me"	1970	Silver Fox	21	No. 38 R&B
"Games People Play" / "My Train's Comin' In"	1970	Silver Fox	24	
"Piece of My Heart" / "At the Mercy of a Man"	1970	SSS International	839	
"He Made a Woman Out of Me" / "My Train's Coming In"	1970	SSS International	933	
"Let's Go, Let's Go, Let's Go" (with Hank Ballard)	1970	SSS International	946	
"Hello, Sunshine" (with Hank Ballard)	c. 1970	SSS International		unreleased
"I'm in Love"	1970	Silver Fox		unreleased
"We Got to Slip Around"	c. 1970	SSS International		unreleased
"Easier to Say (Than Do)"	c. 1970	SSS International		unreleased
"Never My Love" / "Stormy"	1971	TCA	001	
"Heart of Gold" / "You'll Wake Up Wiser"	1972	Atco	6891	
"Your Turn to Cry" / "Soul Tambourine"	1973	Atco	6913	
"Thank You for Loving Me" / "You Made a Believer Out of Me"	1975	Epic	50143	No. 94 R&B
"Behind Closed Doors" / "You're a Man of Words, I'm a Woman of Action"	1975	Epic	50177	
"Feelings"	1978			unreleased
"Shoestring"	1978			unreleased
"Doin' the Best I Can Pt. 1" / "Doin' the Best I Can Pt. 2"	1978	West End	1213	No. 13 Dance Club Songs
"Right in the Middle (Of Falling in Love)" / "You've Seen One You've Seen 'em All"	1982	Motown	1532	No. 35 R&B
"I Can't Stop" / "Either Way We Lose"	1982	Motown	1614	No. 35 R&B
"Trance Dance Pt. 1" / "Trance Dance Pt. 2"	1984	Street King		
"Not Gonna Happen Twice"	1990	Motor City		UK only
"Damn Your Eyes" / "Out Cold"	1997	Bar None		Cassette only
"The Last Goodbye" (Odesza feat. Bettye LaVette)	2022	Foreign Family Collective/Ninja Tune		No. 10 Dance
"Plan B"	2023	Jay Vee		

== Bibliography ==
- A Woman Like Me by Bettye Lavette with David Ritz (Blue Rider Press, New York 2012)
