= The Scene of the Crime =

Studio album by Bettye LaVette
- Released: September 25, 2007
- Recorded: FAME (Muscle Shoals, Alabama); Water Music (Hoboken, New Jersey); Chase Park Transduction (Athens, Georgia)
- Genres: Soul, R&B, blues, rock
- Length: 41:22
- Label: Anti-
- Producers: Bettye LaVette, David Barbe, Patterson Hood

Bettye LaVette chronology
I've Got My Own Hell to Raise (2005)	The Scene of the Crime (2007)	Interpretations: The British Rock Songbook (2010)

Professional ratings
Review scores
Source	Rating
AllMusic	4.5/5 stars
BBC Music	(favorable)
Billboard	(favorable)
Blender	4/5 stars
Entertainment Weekly	A−
The Guardian	3/5 stars
PopMatters	7/10
Rolling Stone	3/5 stars
Slant Magazine	4.5/5 stars
The Village Voice	(favorable)

The Scene of the Crime is a studio album by American singer-songwriter Bettye LaVette, released in the United States on September 25, 2007, on the label Anti-. It is a collaboration with Drive-By Truckers as backing band, Spooner Oldham on piano, and other studio musicians. The album debuted at number one on Billboard's Top Blues Albums chart and was nominated for Best Contemporary Blues Album at the 2008 Grammy Awards.

== Track listing ==
1. "I Still Want to Be Your Baby (Take Me Like I Am)" (Eddie Hinton) – 3:45
  - Originally recorded by Eddie Hinton
2. "Choices" (Billy Yates, Mike Curtis) – 3:04
  - Originally recorded by George Jones
3. "Jealousy" (Frankie Miller) – 5:36
  - Originally recorded by Frankie Miller
4. "You Don't Know Me at All" (Don Henley, John Corey, Stan Lynch) – 3:58
  - Originally recorded by Don Henley
5. "Somebody Pick Up My Pieces" (Willie Nelson) – 5:22
  - Originally recorded by Willie Nelson
6. "They Call It Love" (W. T. Davidson) – 3:57
  - Originally recorded by Ray Charles
7. "The Last Time" (John Hiatt) – 2:58
  - Originally recorded by John Hiatt
8. "Talking Old Soldiers" (Elton John, Bernie Taupin) – 4:26
  - Originally recorded by Elton John
9. "Before the Money Came (The Battle of Bettye LaVette)" (Bettye LaVette, Patterson Hood) – 4:30
10. "I Guess We Shouldn't Talk About That Now" (Ed Pettersen, Kim McLean) – 3:46

== Personnel ==
=== Musicians ===
- Bettye LaVette – vocals
- Mike Cooley – guitar
- Sum Haque – piano
- Kelvin Holly – guitar
- David Hood – bass guitar
- Patterson Hood – guitar
- Brad Morgan – drums
- John Neff – guitar, pedal steel guitar
- Spooner Oldham – piano, Wurlitzer electric piano
- Shonna Tucker – bass

=== Production ===
- Bettye LaVette – producer
- John Agnello – additional engineer
- David Barbe – producer, engineer, mixing, additional engineer
- Elizabeth Fladung – portrait photography
- Gene Grimaldi – mastering
- Patterson Hood – producer, liner notes
- Andy Kaulkin – executive producer
- Kevin Kiley – photography
- Bryan Sheffield – photography, cover photo
- Benjamin Tanner – engineer

== Charts ==
Chart performance for The Scene of the Crime
Chart (2007)	Peak position
US Heatseekers Albums (Billboard)	13
US Independent Albums (Billboard)	46
US Top Blues Albums (Billboard)	1
