= ...and proud of it! =

Studio album by J.J. Jackson
- Released: 1970
- Studio: Island, London
- Genre: Soul-jazz
- Label: Perception Records
- Producer: Lew Futterman

J.J. Jackson chronology
J.J. Jackson's Dilemma (1970)	''...and proud of it!'' (1970)

...and proud of it! is the fifth and final album released by singer J.J. Jackson, and is also his third album recorded in the United Kingdom. The album was released by Perception Records in 1970.

== History and critical reception ==
...and proud of it! was recorded during the latter part of 1970. While produced by Jackson's longtime producer Lew Futterman, the album was largely a project of keyboardist Chris Parren, later associated with The Strawbs, among other bands, and trombonist John Bennett, who had developed his reputation as a jazz musician, with Kenny Ball and his Jazzmen. Jackson's own writing contributions to the album were comparatively minor, though he continued to be credited as arranger, as was the case with all of Jackson's previous albums and most of Jackson's singles.

Bennett had worked with Jackson on his previous album, J.J. Jackson's Dilemma, released earlier in 1970. ...and proud of it! included other musicians from those earlier sessions, though key band members Dick Morrissey, Terry Smith and Dave Quincy were absent. The three had left to co-found the band If, at the suggestion of Jackson producer Lew Futterman, who also became the group's manager. Parren and Bennett, along with Terry Smith and Dick Morrissey, had also worked with Jackson earlier in 1970 on To Seek a New Home, an album by Brother Jack McDuff, recorded in England at Island Studios, where ...and proud of it! was also recorded. Jackson had previously worked and recorded with McDuff when the two were in America.

The single from the album was "Nobody's Gonne Help you (Less'n You Help Yourself)", with "Help Me Get My Grits", from the British version of J.J. Jackson's Dilemma, as the B-side.

== Track listing ==
- A1 Yellow Wednesday (Parren, Bennett) 5:48
- A2 Mag Bag (Parren, Bennett) 5:05
- A3 On The Horn Of Dilemma (uncredited) 8:25
- A4 The Lioness Has Shed Her Mane (Parren, Bennett) 4:37
- B1 The Carrot (Parren, Bennett) 5:28
- B2 I'm Going Through Changes (Jackson, Parren, Stone) 3:53
- B3 Circles (uncredited) 3:56
- B4 Nobody's Gonna Help You (Less'n You Help Yourself) (Jackson, Stone) 4:32
- B5 Indian Thing (Jackson, Steele, Grigson) 6:28

== Credits ==
- Arranged by J.J. Jackson
- Percussion, Piano – J.J. Jackson
- Trombone – John Bennett
- Organ – Chris Parren
- Bass – Jeff McCarthy
- Drums – Philip Leaford
- Guitar – Kevan Fogarty
- Tenor Saxophone, Flute, Alto Flute – Norman
- Baritone Saxophone – Dick Parry
- Trumpet – George Barker
- Trumpet - Roy Edwards
- Engineer – Frank Owen
- Recorded at Island Studios
- Producer – Lew Futterman
