= Ball w/o You =

2018 song by 21 Savage

Song by 21 Savage

from the album I Am Greater than I Was
- Released: December 21, 2018
- Genre: Trap
- Length: 3:15
- Label: Slaughter Gang; Epic
- Songwriters: Shéyaa Abraham-Joseph; Bryan Simmons; Kenneth Smith, Jr.; Tyshane Thompson; Ralphy London
- Producer: TM88

Music video
- "Ball w/o You" on YouTube

"Ball w/o You" (stylized in all lowercase, pronounced "Ball without You") is a song by British-American rapper 21 Savage from his second studio album I Am Greater than I Was (2018). It was produced by TM88.

== Background and composition ==
"Ball w/o You" finds 21 Savage expressing his heartbreak from relationships, stating he prefers loyalty over love; in the first verse, he says, "I'd rather have loyalty than love / 'Cause love really don't mean jack / See love is just a feeling / You can love somebody and still stab them in the back". He raps in a falsetto voice on the song.

The song was speculated to be referencing model Amber Rose, the ex-girlfriend of 21 Savage, but Savage confirmed in an interview with The Breakfast Club that it was not about her.

== Critical reception ==
A.D. Amorosi of Variety regarded the song to be "soulfully inventive" and a moment in which I Am > I Was is "at its best and most dynamic." Tom Breihan of Stereogum described 21 Savage's vocals as "a gloriously unlistenable sound even when it's smothered in Auto-Tune." Steve "Flash" Juon of RapReviews wrote, "It would need to be cleaned up for the radio a bit but TM88's work on 'Ball w/o You' is a sure fire hit."

== Music video ==
An official music video was released on April 29, 2019. Directed by Walu, it opens at a nightclub where 21 Savage's fictional ex-girlfriend drinking and taking selfies with her friends, before drunkenly stumbling into the bathroom, where she passes out in a stall while trying to take pictures of herself and is kicking and screaming as security drags her out. Meanwhile, 21 Savage sits from the balcony of his lavish home with a new girlfriend by his side as he gazes into the skyline of Los Angeles. His ex is next seen taking photos of herself in front of a large, lavish home and clear sky. The camera zooms out to show her on the curb with her packed bags.

== Charts ==
Chart (2019)	Peak position
US Bubbling Under Hot 100 (Billboard)	1
US Hot R&B/Hip-Hop Songs (Billboard)	41

== Certifications ==
Region	Certification	Certified units/sales
Brazil (Pro-Música Brasil)	Platinum	40,000^{‡}
Canada (Music Canada)	3× Platinum	240,000^{‡}
Denmark (IFPI Danmark)	Gold	45,000^{‡}
France (SNEP)	Gold	100,000^{‡}
New Zealand (RMNZ)	Platinum	30,000^{‡}
Poland (ZPAV)	Gold	25,000^{‡}
United Kingdom (BPI)	Gold	400,000^{‡}
United States (RIAA)	4× Platinum	4,000,000^{‡}
^{‡} Sales+streaming figures based on certification alone.
