= A Woman Like Me (album) =

Studio album by Bettye LaVette
- Released: January 21, 2003
- Genre: Southern soul
- Length: 58:44
- Label: Blues Express
- Producers: Bettye LaVette, Alan Mirikitani, Dennis Walker

Bettye LaVette chronology
Let Me Down Easy In Concert (2001)	A Woman Like Me (2003)	I've Got My Own Hell to Raise (2005)

A Woman Like Me is a studio album by American singer Bettye LaVette, released on January 21, 2003, by Blues Express. It was her first U.S. release in 20 years and was recorded by LaVette with producer and songwriter Dennis Walker.

== Critical reception ==
AllMusic's Hal Horowitz gave A Woman Like Me four out of five stars and called it "a powerful album — moving, intense, and honest". He found Dennis Walker's "heart-tugging yet defiant material" suited for LaVette, whose performance he compared to "Otis Redding at his most impassioned", and felt that her matured voice adds emotional depth. Q magazine gave it three stars and credited LaVette for "knocking the bejesus out of" the songs on a "tough-talking, bluesy" album. In its three-star review, Mojo found its stories of "broken hearts and promises" similar to Tennessee Williams and wrote that LaVette's vocals "remain remarkably untarnished by age". NPR called it as "the finest comeback set in recent memory."

Living Blues felt that A Woman Like Me will rank as one of the year's best albums. Jon Pareles of The New York Times called it "pure Southern soul" and said that "Lavette shows every scar and every wily survivor's instinct in her leathery voice." Robert Christgau, writing in The Village Voice, gave the album an "A" and said that, although "mad genius" Dennis Walker "crafts a batch of long-suffering miniatures that make the record", LaVette "makes the songs—though she's gritty and loves to testify, she never overdoes it. What's more, she's got the psychological equilibrium to find optimistic material she can put across just as passionately."

== Track listing ==
1. "Serves Him Right" (Buddy Johnson, Dennis Walker) 4:19
2. "The Forecast" (Walker, David Plenn) 5:02
3. "Thru the Winter" (Walker) 5:49
4. "Right Next Door" (Walker) 4:30
5. "When the Blues Catch Up to You" (Walker, Alan Mirikitani) 4:44
6. "Thinkin' 'Bout You" 4:59
7. "A Woman Like Me" (Walker, Greg Brown, Linda Thomas) 5:53
8. "It Ain't Worth It After a While" (Walker, Mirikitani) 5:21
9. "When a Woman's Had Enough" (Walker, Mirikitani) 4:16
10. "Salt on My Wounds" (Walker, Mirikitani) 4:39
11. "Close as I'll Get to Heaven" (Rene Gayer) 4:54
12. "Hey, Hey Baby (Bettye's Blues)" (Bettye LaVette) 4:18

== Personnel ==
Credits adapted from AllMusic.

- Bettye LaVette - vocals
- Cynthia Bass - backing vocals
- Alan Mirikitani - rhythm and lead guitar
- Mike Turner - acoustic and rhythm guitar
- Bobby Murray - rhythm guitar
- Rudy Robinson - keyboards
- Richard Cousins - bass
- Lee Spath - drums
- Bruce Paulson - trombone
- Tom Peterson - baritone and tenor saxophone, horn arrangements
