= I've Got My Own Hell to Raise =

Studio album by Bettye LaVette
- Released: September 27, 2005
- Genre: R&B
- Length: 39:08
- Label: Anti-
- Producer: Joe Henry

Bettye LaVette chronology
A Woman Like Me (2003)	I've Got My Own Hell to Raise (2005)	The Scene of the Crime (2007)

Professional ratings
Review scores
Source	Rating
AllMusic	4/5 stars
The Guardian	2/5 stars

I've Got My Own Hell to Raise is an album by Bettye LaVette. It was released on September 27, 2005, on Anti-. The album comprises covers of songs written by other female artists including Aimee Mann, Joan Armatrading, Sinéad O'Connor, Rosanne Cash, Dolly Parton and Fiona Apple, whose song "Sleep to Dream" (1997) contains the album's title within its lyrics. I've Got My Own Hell to Raise was chosen as one of Amazon.com's Top 100 Editor's Picks of 2005.

== Track listing ==
1. "I Do Not Want What I Haven't Got" (Sinéad O'Connor) – 2:11
2. "Joy" (Lucinda Williams) – 3:55
3. "Down to Zero" (Joan Armatrading) – 3:10
4. "The High Road" (Sharon Robinson) – 4:29
5. "On the Surface" (Rosanne Cash) – 3:26
6. "Just Say So" (Cathy Majeski, John Scott Sherrill) – 4:29
7. "Little Sparrow" (Dolly Parton) – 4:41
8. "How Am I Different" (Aimee Mann, Jon Brion) – 4:28
9. "Only Time Will Tell" (Toni Brown) – 4:33
10. "Sleep to Dream" by (Fiona Apple) – 3:46

== Personnel ==
Musicians

- Bettye LaVette – vocals
- Chris Bruce – acoustic and electric guitar
- Doyle Bramhall II – electric guitar
- Lisa Coleman – piano, organ, Wurlitzer electric piano
- Paul Bryan – electric bass
- Earl Harvin – drums
- David Piltch – upright bass
- Niki Harris – backing vocals
- Valerie Watson – backing vocals

Production

- Joe Henry – producer
- Andy Kaulkin – executive producer
- S. Husky Höskulds – engineer, mixing
- Gavin Lurssen – mastering

== Charts ==
Chart performance for I've Got My Own Hell to Raise
Chart (2005)	Peak position
US Independent Albums (Billboard)	44
US Top Blues Albums (Billboard)	4
