= Watson (musician) =

American singer and songwriter

- Born: Travis Galette; Los Angeles, California, U.S.
- Occupations: Singer; songwriter
- Years active: 2016–present
- Musical career
- Genres: Hip hop; R&B; pop; pop rap; rap rock
- Instrument: Vocals
- Label: TruColors
- Website: theonlywatson.com

Travis Galette, known professionally as Watson, is an American singer and songwriter. Known for his coarse vocals, Watson has a reputation for exploring and combining a wide range of musical genres. Originally recruited by Brian Lee, Watson entered the music industry collaborating with artists Post Malone and 21 Savage. He subsequently went on to write and perform his own music with his single "Dance Alone" which would become a "sensation" on the social media video platform TikTok.

== Career ==
Watson began his career in Los Angeles. While working at a Jersey Mike's sandwich shop, he received a phone call from Brian Lee asking him to "come to the studio," leading him to quit his job. From there, Watson (credited as Travis Galette) began a career of song writing, gaining credits for 21 Savage's "All of My Friends" from the album I Am > I Was and contributing to Post Malone's Hollywoods Bleeding. During this time, Watson released two tracks, "Love Me" and "Confident." His artistic relationship with Post Malone allowed him to open for one of the LA dates of Malones Stoney Tour in 2017. He also recorded the video for "Love Me" in Malone's house.

In 2020, Watson released the single "Dance Alone" which would be featured on his debut EP Hallelujah, I'm Free. The song would later become viral on the online video sharing platform TikTok, where users would record themselves dancing to the chorus of the song. In May 2020, Watson released another track from Hallelujah, "Kitty Kitty." Inspired after six months of celibacy, Watson explained that "it was a stressful and lonely journey" and that he used music to "work his way through it." He told Billboard that he felt "Kitty Kitty" was more representative of himself than "Dance Alone" had been.

In August 2020, Watson released the single "Formula 50," ahead of his first album.

== Charity work ==
During his youth, Watson was at times homeless. He would later use these experiences as inspiration for the track "Formula 50." Because of this, a portion of the sales stemming from the song will be donated to My Friends Place, an LA based charity that helps to raise homeless youths into self-sufficiency.

== Discography ==
- Hallelujah, I'm Free (2020)

== Tours ==
=== Opening act ===
- Post Malone – Stoney Tour (2017)
