= Worthy (Bettye LaVette album) =

Studio album by Bettye LaVette
- Released: January 27, 2015
- Recorded: August 19–23, 2014
- Genres: Blues; soul; funk; jazz; R&B
- Length: 43:59
- Label: Cherry Red
- Producers: Joe Henry; Bettye LaVette

Bettye LaVette chronology
Interpretations: The British Rock Songbook (2010)	Worthy (2015)	Things Have Changed (2018)

Worthy is a studio album from Bettye LaVette. Cherry Red Records released the album on January 27, 2015. She worked with Joe Henry, in the production of this album. The album was nominated for Best Blues Album at the 58th Annual Grammy Awards.

== Critical reception ==
Professional ratings
Aggregate scores
Source	Rating
Metacritic	80/100
Review scores
Source	Rating
AllMusic	4/5 stars
Blurt	4/5 stars
PopMatters	8/10

Awarding the album four stars at AllMusic, Mark Deming stated, "Worthy is another impressive release from an outstanding singer, and if it follows the pattern of some of her recent albums, nothing here sounds rote; this is the sound of an artist doing what she does best, and she is far more than worthy of this great music." Colin McGuire, rating the album an eight out of ten for PopMatters, wrote that Worthy succeeds because "Bettye LaVette knows her strengths. She knows what makes that voice of hers so timeless, and she knows how to make songs sound like they are her own, even if she had no part in writing them. If these 11 tracks were designed to remind the world of a criminally forgotten musical treasure, they succeeded and then some." Giving the album four stars from Blurt, Michael Toland remarked, "This record isn't just Worthy – it's essential."

== Track listing ==
Worthy track listing
No.	Title	Writer(s)	Length
1.	"Unbelievable"	Bob Dylan	3:15
2.	"When I Was a Young Girl"	Chris Youlden	3:40
3.	"Bless Us All"	Mickey Newbury	2:49
4.	"Stop"	Joseph Lee Henry	4:24
5.	"Undamned"	Linford Detweiler	3:32
6.	"Complicated"	Mick Jagger, Keith Richards	3:43
7.	"Where a Life Goes"	Randall Bramblett	5:04
8.	"Just Between You and Me and the Wall, You're a Fool"	James H. Brown Jr.	6:39
9.	"Wait"	John Lennon, Paul McCartney	3:40
10.	"Step Away"	Brian Mitchell, Christine Santelli	3:03
11.	"Worthy"	Beth Nielsen Chapman, Mary Gauthier	4:10
Total length:			43:59

== Personnel ==
- Jay Bellerose – drums, percussion
- Doyle Bramhall II – bass, guitar
- Chris Bruce – bass, acoustic guitar
- Ben Chapoteau-Katz – baritone sax
- Levon Henry – horn arrangements, tenor sax
- Linton Smith – trumpet
- Patrick Warren – Chamberlin, Hammond organ, piano

== Chart performance ==
Chart performance for Worthy
Chart (2015)	Peak position
US Top Blues Albums (Billboard)	7
