= Interpretations: The British Rock Songbook =

Studio album by Bettye LaVette
- Released: May 25, 2010
- Genres: Soul, R&B
- Length: 56:32
- Label: Anti-
- Producers: Bettye LaVette, Michael Stevens, Rob Mathes

Bettye LaVette chronology
The Scene of the Crime (2007)	Interpretations: The British Rock Songbook (2010)	Worthy (2012)

Professional ratings
Aggregate scores
Source	Rating
Metacritic	73/100
Review scores
Source	Rating
AllMusic	4/5 stars
The A.V. Club	B+
The Boston Phoenix	3/4 stars
Entertainment Weekly	A–
Paste	7.6/10
Pitchfork	7.3/10
Slant Magazine	4/5 stars

Interpretations: The British Rock Songbook is a studio album by soul musician Bettye LaVette, which covers songs by British rock legends such as the Beatles, Elton John, Led Zeppelin, Pink Floyd, and more. The album was released in 2010 under Anti- Records. On June 21, 2010, it charted at number 1 on the US Billboard Top Blues Albums, where it was in the charts for 39 weeks.

== Track listing ==
Interpretations: The British Rock Songbook track listing
No.	Title	Writer(s)	Length
1.	"The Word"	Lennon-McCartney	3:37
2.	"No Time to Live"	Steve Winwood, Jim Capaldi	4:28
3.	"Don't Let Me Be Misunderstood"	Bennie Benjamin, Gloria Caldwell, Sol Marcus	3:49
4.	"All My Love"	John Paul Jones, Robert Plant	4:11
5.	"Isn't It a Pity"	George Harrison	4:19
6.	"Wish You Were Here"	Roger Waters, David Gilmour	3:49
7.	"It Don't Come Easy"	Ringo Starr	4:34
8.	"Maybe I'm Amazed"	Paul McCartney	3:50
9.	"Salt of the Earth"	Mick Jagger, Keith Richards	4:28
10.	"Nights in White Satin"	Justin Hayward	4:23
11.	"Why Does Love Got to Be So Sad"	Eric Clapton, Bobby Whitlock	3:57
12.	"Don't Let the Sun Go Down on Me"	Elton John, Bernie Taupin	5:36
13.	"Love, Reign o'er Me"	Pete Townshend	5:31

== Personnel ==
- Bettye LaVette – vocals
- Shane Fontayne – guitar
- Rob Mathes – keyboards, acoustic and electric guitar
- Zev Katz – electric bass, double bass
- Charley Drayton – drums, percussion
- Andy Snitzer – tenor saxophone
- Aaron Heick – alto saxophone
- Jeff Kievit – trumpet
- Michael Davis – trombone
- James "D-Train" Williams, Rob Mathes, Tabitha Fair, Vaneese Thomas – backing vocals

== Charts ==
Chart performance for Interpretations: The British Rock Songbook
Chart (2012)	Peak position
Belgian Albums (Ultratop Flanders)	69
Swiss Albums (Schweizer Hitparade)	86
US Billboard 200	56
US Independent Albums (Billboard)	6
US Top Blues Albums (Billboard)	1
