= Monster (21 Savage song) =

2019 song by 21 Savage

Single by 21 Savage featuring Childish Gambino

from the album I Am > I Was
- Released: May 7, 2019
- Recorded: 2018
- Genre: Hip hop
- Length: 3:53
- Label: Slaughter Gang; Epic
- Songwriters: Shéyaa Abraham-Joseph; Donald Glover; Dacoury Natche; Axel Morgan; Jake Austin; Calvin Tarvin
- Producers: DJ Dahi; Axl Folie; Dave Sava6e; Tiggi

21 Savage singles chronology
"Enzo" (2019)	"Monster" (2019)	"100 Bands" (2019)

Childish Gambino singles chronology
"Summertime Magic" (2018)	"Monster" (2019)	"Time" (2020)

"Monster" is a song by British-American rapper 21 Savage featuring fellow American rapper and actor Childish Gambino from the former's second studio album I Am > I Was (2018). It was produced by DJ Dahi, Axl Folie, Dave Sava6e, and Tiggi. The song was first previewed on December 16, 2018 on 21 Savage's Instagram and was eventually sent to rhythmic contemporary radio on May 7, 2019.

== Composition and lyrics ==
The song is about how wealth and fame can turn a person into a "monster", as summarized in the chorus: "Power / The money and the fame make a monster." Childish Gambino also expresses his disillusionment in the music industry, rapping: "Me and Savage, we came from the dirt / If you rappin' for money, you silly / This shit ain't a milli', this shit is a hundred / The industry savage and most of you average".

== Live performances ==
On August 3, 2019, 21 Savage performed the song at Lollapalooza with Childish Gambino.

== Charts ==
Chart (2019)	Peak position
Australia (ARIA)	97
Canada Hot 100 (Billboard)	56
New Zealand (Recorded Music NZ)	26
Sweden Heatseeker (Sverigetopplistan)	2
US Billboard Hot 100	73
US Hot R&B/Hip-Hop Songs (Billboard)	28
US Rhythmic Airplay (Billboard)	35

== Certifications ==
Region	Certification	Certified units/sales
Canada (Music Canada)	Platinum	80,000^{‡}
United States (RIAA)	Platinum	1,000,000^{‡}
^{‡} Sales+streaming figures based on certification alone.
