= The Sandpebbles (R&B group) =

American musical group

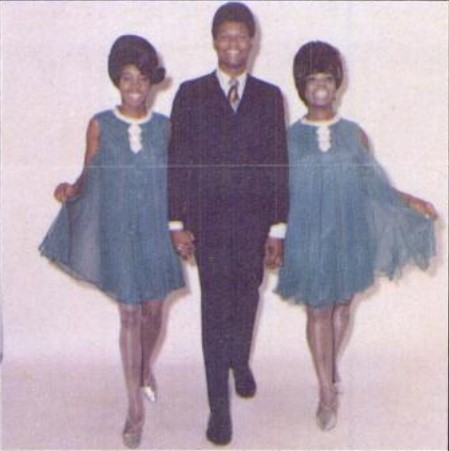

Background information
- Years active: 1960s
- Labels: Calla Records, Toast, Track Records
- Spinoffs: C & The Shells

The Sandpebbles were an American R&B vocal group composed of Calvin White, Andrea Bolden, and Lonzine Wright. They recorded for Calla Records, and had one major pop hit in the U.S., "Love Power", which hit #14 on the Billboard Black Singles chart in 1967 and #22 on the Billboard Hot 100 chart the following year. An album containing their complete recorded output was issued on compact disc in 2000.

The Sandpebbles are considered one-hit wonders due to "Love Power" having been their only successful pop single. However, their previous release, "Forget It," reached #10 on the Billboard R&B chart (#81 pop) in 1967.

One of the group's singles, "If You Didn't Hear Me The First Time (I'll Say It Again)" bw "Flower Power" was released in the UK on Toast TT 505.

In 1968, the Sandpebbles left Calla for Cotillion. For legal reasons, they changed their name to C & The Shells. The following year, with producer Jerry (Swamp Dogg) Williams, they hit #28 R&B with "You Are the Circus." By 1970, they were on the minuscule Zanzee label, where they recorded without success. C & The Shells broke up in 1973.

"Love Power" was revived in 1991 by Luther Vandross in part of a medley called "Power of Love/Love Power." Vandross' version had much more success than the original, going to #4 on the Billboard Hot 100 and spending a week at #1 on the R&B list. It was also recorded by British singer Dusty Springfield for her 1968 album Dusty... Definitely.
