= Don Gardner =

American drummer

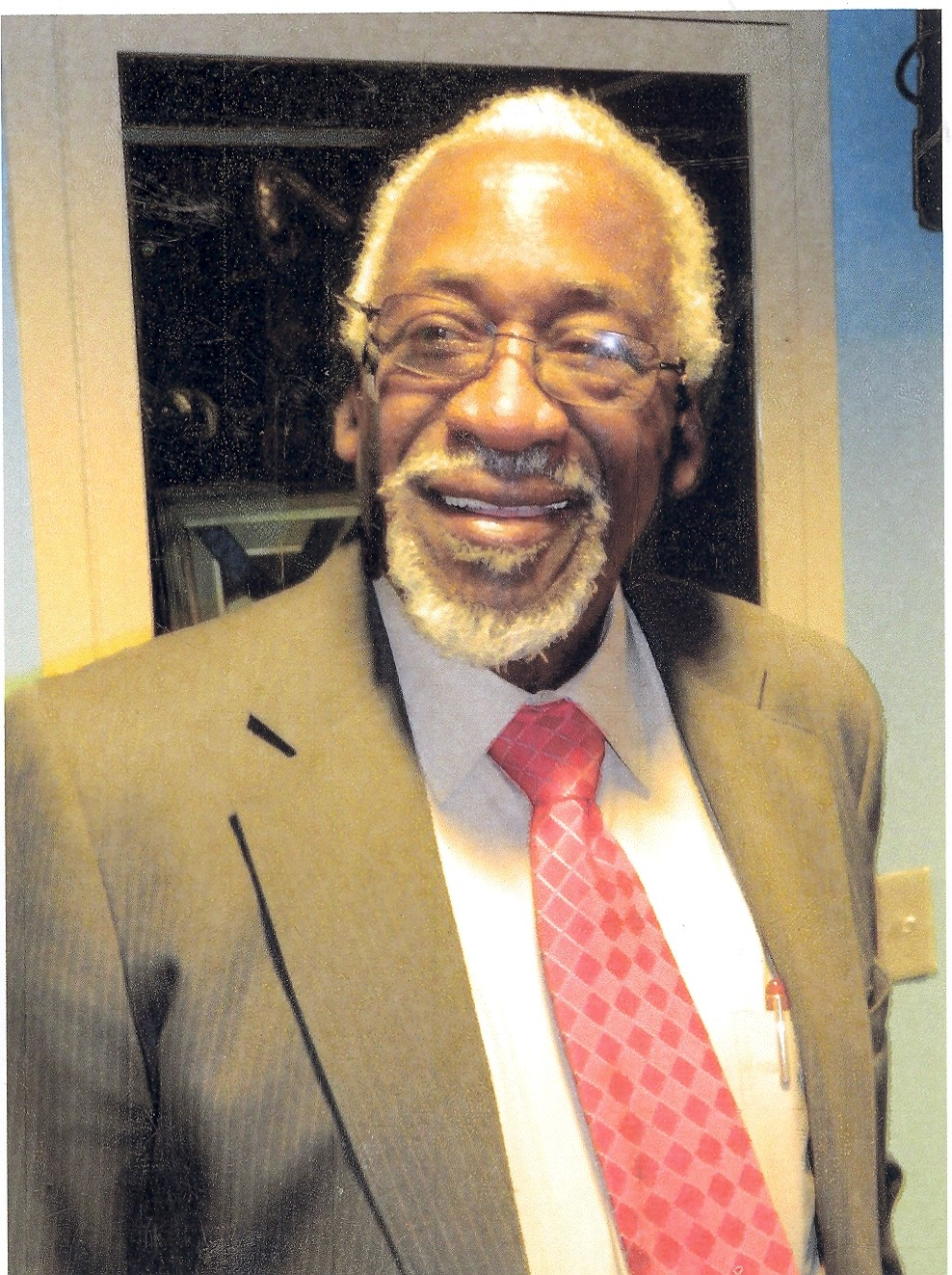
- Gardner at the Clef Club of Jazz in Philadelphia in 2012

Background information
- Born: Donald Gardner; May 9, 1931; Philadelphia, Pennsylvania, U.S.
- Died: September 4, 2018 (aged 87) Philadelphia, Pennsylvania, U.S.
- Genre: Rhythm and blues
- Occupations: Singer, drummer, bandleader, songwriter

Donald Gardner (May 9, 1931 – September 4, 2018) was an American rhythm and blues singer, songwriter, and drummer. His records included the 1962 hit "I Need Your Lovin'", with Dee Dee Ford.

== Biography ==
Born in Philadelphia, Gardner started out as a professional musician in 1947 while still at school. He first recorded as a singer on the Gotham label in 1949. By 1953, he formed his own group, the Sonotones, in which he played drums and sang. The group toured on the Chitlin' Circuit, and Gardner also recorded under his own name, for De Luxe Records and the small Junior label.

Keyboardist Richard "Groove" Holmes left the Sonotones in early 1960, and was replaced by Dee Dee Ford (aka Dottie Ford, married name Wrecia Holloway, née Wrecia Mae Ford, 1936–1972). (Note: Wrecia Ford, in March 1955 at Newark, New Jersey, married Calvin Holloway. (Ancestry.com)) She had lived in Newark, New Jersey and sang and played organ in church. When the Sonotones played at the Smalls Paradise club in Harlem, New York, they were heard by blues performer Arthur Crudup, who recommended them to the Fire record label owner Bobby Robinson. He produced a song written by Gardner, I Need Your Loving (also known as Need Your Lovin'), a "gospel-drenched" call-and-response number in the mold of Ike & Tina Turner, and the song became their biggest hit, rising to number 4 on the Billboard R&B chart in 1962 and number 20 on the pop chart. The song was later recorded by Otis Redding, Alexis Korner, Tom Jones, Jackie Wilson, and many others.

KC Records, Gardner and Ford's previous record company, then released "Glory of Love", which made number 75 on the pop chart, before Fire released the official follow-up, "Don't You Worry", which reached number 7 on the R&B chart and number 66 pop. After recording an LP for Fire, Need Your Lovin', Gardner and Ford left the label, and – following the death of Gardner's wife in an accident – toured Sweden for a change of scene. They recorded a live album, Quintet in Sweden, released by Sonet Records in 1965 and described as having "a solid R&B base with jazzy overtones that is veering towards early soul", and also recorded several tracks with Freda Payne for her album Freda Payne in Stockholm.

When they returned to the US, Gardner and Ford went their separate ways. Ford wrote the song "Let Me Down Easy", a hit for Bettye LaVette in 1965, but soon retired from the music industry. Gardner continued to perform and record throughout the 1960s and 1970s, releasing a string of singles on various labels including Jubilee, Verve, and Tru-Glo-Town. In the early 1970s, he recorded with Jeanette "Baby" Washington, and their recording on the Master 5 label of "Forever", a minor hit in 1963 for the Marvelettes, reached number 30 on the R&B chart in 1973.

== Death ==
Gardner continued to work as a jazz musician, and had been part of the management of the Philadelphia Clef Club of Jazz & Performing Arts in Philadelphia since 1985, serving as executive director. Lovett Hines, the current Artistic Director of the Philadelphia Clef Club of Jazz & Performing Arts, was at the hospital when Gardner died, playing the artist's music. "And I just held the telephone to his ear on YouTube," Hines said. "And you could see his reaction with his eyes moving and moving his hand. So he responded to the music, and I'm glad that was the last thing he heard". Gardner died on September 4, 2018, at the age of 87.

== Discography ==
=== Albums ===
- The Don Gardner Trio featuring Jimmy Smith and Bill Davis (recorded 1955, issued 1963)
- Need Your Lovin' (Don Gardner & Dee Dee Ford, 1962)
- The Don Gardner and Dee Dee Ford Quintet in Sweden (1965)
- The Exciting Jimmy Smith with the Don Gardner Trio (1969)
- Lay a Little Lovin' on Me (Baby Washington & Don Gardner, 1973)
- Very Best of Don Gardner & Dee Dee Ford (1999)

==== As guest artist ====
- Patrick Stanfield Jones - A Heart and an Open Road (2010)

=== Chart singles ===
Year	Single	Chart positions	
Year	Single	US Pop	US R&B
1962	"I Need Your Loving"; Don Gardner and Dee Dee Ford	20	4
1962	"Glory of Love"; Don Gardner and Dee Dee Ford	75	—
1962	"Don't You Worry"; Don Gardner and Dee Dee Ford	66	7
1966	"My Baby Likes to Boogaloo"	— (Note: My Baby Likes to Boogaloo" did not reach the Hot 100, but peaked at number 26 on the Bubbling Under Hot 100.)	—
1973	"Forever"; Baby Washington and Don Gardner	—	30
"—" denotes releases that did not chart.
