= Things Have Changed (album) =

Studio album by Bettye LaVette
- Released: March 30, 2018
- Genres: R&B, Americana
- Label: Verve
- Producer: Steve Jordan

Bettye LaVette chronology
Worthy (2015)	Things Have Changed (2018)

Professional ratings
Aggregate scores
Source	Rating
Metacritic	85/100
Review scores
Source	Rating
AllMusic	4/5 stars
PopMatters	9/10
Rolling Stone	4/5 stars

Things Have Changed is a studio album by Bettye LaVette. It was released in March 2018 through Verve Records. The album features songs originally written and sung by Bob Dylan.

The album received a nomination for Best Americana Album and "Don't Fall Apart on Me Tonight" received a nomination for Best Traditional R&B Performance at the 61st Annual Grammy Awards.

Greil Marcus, writing in the Village Voice, named it the best album of 2018.

Lavette's arrangement of the title track has proven influential. Both Margo Price and Adia Victoria have performed the song live in arrangements directly inspired by LaVette's.

== Track listing ==
All tracks composed by Bob Dylan

No.	Title	Length
1.	"Things Have Changed"	6:57
2.	"It Ain't Me Babe"	5:46
3.	"Political World"	4:03
4.	"Don't Fall Apart on Me Tonight"	5:21
5.	"Seeing the Real You at Last"	5:08
6.	"Mama, You Been on My Mind"	3:47
7.	"Ain't Talkin'"	5:41
8.	"The Times They Are A-Changin'"	5:10
9.	"What Was It You Wanted"	4:47
10.	"Emotionally Yours"	5:27
11.	"Do Right to Me Baby (Do Unto Others)"	3:38
12.	"Going, Going, Gone"	4:06

== Charts ==
Chart performance for Things Have Changed
Chart (2018)	Peak position
Austrian Albums (Ö3 Austria)	49
Dutch Albums (Album Top 100)	198
Swiss Albums (Schweizer Hitparade)	20
US Indie Store Album Sales (Billboard)	10

== See also ==
- List of songs written by Bob Dylan
- List of artists who have covered Bob Dylan songs
