= J. J. Jackson's Dilemma =

J.J. Jackson's Dilemma
- Perception Records cover

Studio album by J.J. Jackson's Dilemma
- Released: 1970
- Genre: Jazz
- Label: Perception, RCA Victor
- Producer: Lew Futterman

J.J. Jackson's Dilemma chronology
The Greatest Little Soul Band in the Land (1969)	J.J. Jackson's Dilemma (1970)	...and proud of it! (1970)

Professional ratings
Review scores
Source	Rating
Allmusic	3.5/5 stars

J.J. Jackson's Dilemma is the fourth album by J. J. Jackson and his second recorded in the UK.

== History and critical reception ==
The album was recorded in London in 1970 with many of the same musicians who had performed with Jackson on his 1969 album, The Greatest Little Soul Band in the Land. A particular addition to the band was the saxophonist Dick Parry, who later achieved notability as the saxophonist on some of the most well-known songs by Pink Floyd, such as "Money".

Released on RCA Victor in the UK and on Perception Records in the US, the album had two different covers and slightly different track listings. The single release from the album, released in the UK and Spain, was "Bow Down To The Dollar", with "Indian Thing" as the B-side. The album is notable as including a song co-written by Jackson and his longtime producer, Lew Futterman, "Go Find Yourself a Woman".

In 2016, the album was re-released on CD by Stoned Circle Records, at which time it was described as being "among Jackson's most interesting work and a highlight of the British underground jazz-rock scene. ...a pure gem of late-'60s fusion. Laden with the essential period quota of fuzz guitar, Hammond organ, and wah-wah effects...".

== Track listings ==
=== Perception Records version ===
1. "Indian Thing" (Jackson, Steele, Grigson) (6:28)
2. "Does Anybody Really Know What Time It Is?" (Robert Lamm) (2:58)
3. "Let the Sunshine In" (Rado, Ragni & MacDermot) (8:40)
4. "Help Me to Get My Grits" (Jackson, Parson) (4:24)
5. "Who Knows" (Jackson) (8:05)
6. "Go Find Yourself a Woman" (Jackson, Futterman) (5:56)
7. "No Sad Songs" (Carter)(4:29)

=== RCA Victor version ===
1. "Indian Thing"
2. "Does Anybody Really Know What Time It Is"
3. "Help Me Get My Grits"
4. "Let the Sunshine In"
5. "Bow Down to the Dollar" (Weiss)
6. "Who Knows"

== Personnel ==
- J. J. Jackson - percussion, vocals, keyboards
- Jeff McCarthy, Larry Steele - bass
- Chris Parren - keyboards
- Dick Morrissey - tenor saxophone, flute
- Dick Parry - saxophone
- Dave Quincy - saxophone
- Terry Smith - guitar
- George Jones - trumpet
- John Bennett - trombone
- George Barker - trumpet
- Roy Edwards - trumpet
- Ian Hague - drums
