= I Love You for All Seasons =

Single by The Fuzz

from the album The Fuzz
- B-side: "I Love You for All Seasons" (Instrumental)
- Released: December 1970
- Genre: Soul
- Length: 2:55
- Label: Calla
- Songwriter: Sheila Young
- Producer: Carr-Cee Productions

The Fuzz singles chronology
"Sister Watch Yourself" (1970)	"I Love You for All Seasons" (1970)	"Like an Open Door" (1971)

"I Love You for All Seasons" is a song written by Sheila Young and performed by The Fuzz. The song was featured on their 1971 album, The Fuzz. The song was produced by Carr-Cee Productions.

== Chart performance ==
It reached #10 on the U.S. R&B chart, #21 on the Billboard Hot 100 in 1971, and #43 in Canada and #100 in Australia.

The single ranked #45 on the Billboard Year-End Hot 100 singles of 1971. list

== Sampled versions ==
- Brand Nubian sampled the song on their song "What the Fuck..." from their 1994 album, Everything Is Everything.
- 21 Savage sampled a cover of the song by East of Underground on his single A Lot from his album I Am > I Was
