= J. J. Jackson (singer) =

American singer, songwriter, and arranger

J.J. Jackson
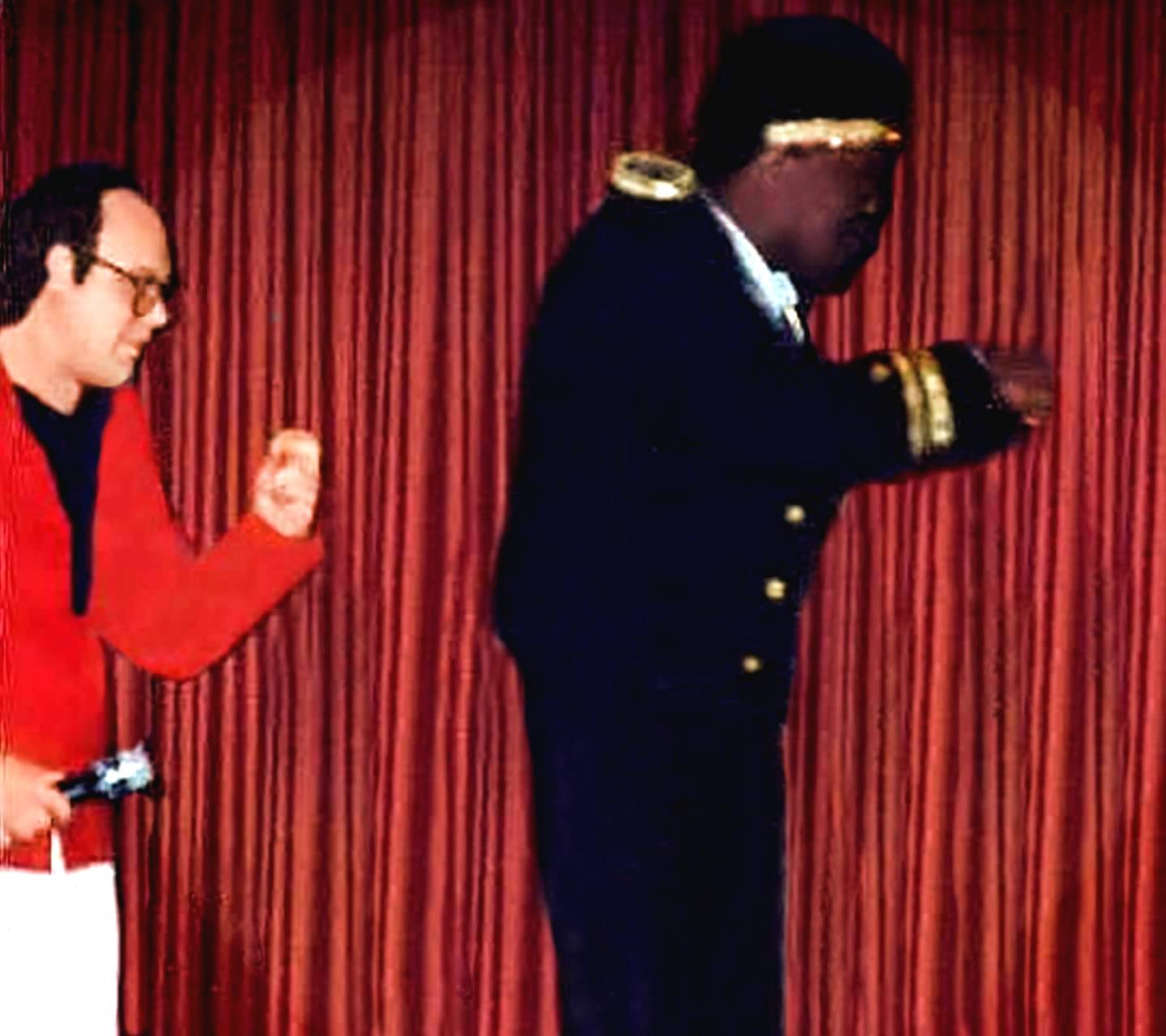
- Jackson and New Wave/R&B singer Dave Chrenko perform on New Year's Eve 1988 in a Los Angeles night spot

Background information
- Born: Jerome Louis Jackson; November 8, 1942 (age 84); The Bronx, New York, U.S.
- Occupations: Singer, songwriter, arranger
- Instruments: Vocals, piano, organ
- Years active: 1957–2004

Jerome Louis "J.J." Jackson (born November 8, 1942) is an American soul/R&B singer, songwriter, and arranger. His singing style is as a belter. Jackson is best known for the song "But It's Alright", which he co-wrote with Pierre Tubbs. The song was released in 1966 and then re-released in 1969, to chart success on both occasions. The liner notes to his 1967 album, J.J. Jackson, on Calla Records, stated that he weighed 285 pounds.

== History ==
Jackson was born in The Bronx, New York. Described as "one of the most interesting obscure figures of '60s soul", Jackson, then based in New York, started out as a songwriter and arranger. His first songwriting credit, at the age of sixteen, was "The Lord Will Understand (And Say 'Well Done')", being the B-side to "Got A Date With An Angel", a 1957 single by Billy Williams. Jackson co-wrote the song with G. Douglas and M. Brent. The song was banned by the BBC for "religious overtones".

Jackson's first single was "Shy Guy", backed with "Time", on Crescent Records and distributed by Fantasy Records, in 1963. Both songs were written by Jackson.

Jackson was later a songwriter and arranger for "Brother" Jack McDuff, Jimmy Witherspoon, and the Shangri-Las, among others. His songwriting credits include Mary Wells' "My Mind's Made Up" and "I've Come to One Conclusion" by Inez and Charlie Foxx, both co-written with fellow soul singer Sidney Barnes. Barnes and Jackson became a freelance songwriting team in 1964, at a time when Jackson was known as both a pianist and a songwriter. Barnes had previously been a lead writer, producer and talent scout for the recently opened New York office of Motown Records and Jobete Music. Barnes and Jackson wrote songs for several R & B solo artists of the period, including Sandra Phillips and Billy Prophet, formerly of The Jive Five. Barnes and Jackson also wrote for The Soul Sisters, and became staff writers at Sue Records, one of the few black-owned record labels based in New York at the time.

Barnes and Jackson were soon thereafter signed to exclusive contracts with Red Bird Records and Trio Music Publishing, owned by Leiber and Stoller. "It's Easier to Cry", by the Shangri-Las and released on Red Bird Records, was co-written by Jackson, Joe De Angelis and Robert Steinberg. The latter song was the B-side to the Shangri-Las' 1964 hit single "Remember (Walking in the Sand)"

By 1965, Barnes had emerged as a solo performer, recording songs written by Barnes and Jackson, including "I Hurt On The Other Side", and "I Don't Know Why".

Jackson is best known for the soul hit "But It's Alright" co-written with Pierre Tubbs and which, after its 1966 release as the B-side of the single "Boogaloo Baby", became one of the best known dance music tunes of the decade, reaching No. 22 on the Billboard chart. The single was recorded in the United Kingdom, being one of the first R & B hit singles to have been recorded in England. The song featured some of Britain's top jazz musicians of the day, including Terry Smith on guitar, Dick Morrissey on tenor sax and John Marshall on drums, and who would later form the backing band for Jackson's second and third albums. The album on which "But It's Alright" was first featured, released by Calla Records, was recorded in New York, with the exception of "But It's Alright". Jackson also co-wrote, with Pierre Tubbs and Sidney Barnes, the Pretty Things' 1966 hit single, "Come See Me." Other versions of "But It's Alright" and "Come See Me" were recorded by Jackson in England, with a band credited as The Jeeps, being a band configuration of Pierre Tubbs and originally released on Strike Records. Strike Records was also the release label in England of Jackson's first album. Brother Jack McDuff, with David "Fathead" Newman, covered "But It's Alright", as an instrumental version, on their 1967 album Double Barrelled Soul. The song was also released as a single. The song was also covered in 1967 by Eddie Floyd and included on Floyd's Knock on Wood album.

In 1967, Jackson was signed to Loma Records, a subsidiary of Warner Bros. Records, prior to the label being absorbed by Warner Bros. in 1968. Jackson released a series of singles on Loma and Warner Bros. between 1967 and 1969. During this period, Jackson co-wrote much of his material with Windsor King, who had worked with Jackson from the time that Jackson was recording with Calla Records. King also co-produced Jackson's material. Jackson also released singles that were co-written and co-produced by Jerry Ragovoy.

In 1969, Warner Bros. Records, which had acquired the catalogue of Calla Records, re-released "But It's Alright". The single peaked at No. 45 on Billboard when it re-entered the chart on March 29, 1969. A Spanish version of the song was also released in 1969. Later that year, Warner Bros. also re-released "Four Walls (Three Windows and Two Doors)", which had originally been released in 1967, as the B-side to "That Ain't Right", written by Cherry Foster and Walter Jessup. "That Ain't Right" had originally been released in 1967 as the B-side to "I Dig Girls". "But It's Alright" and "Four Walls" were then released on one single as "Back to Back Hits".

In 1969, Warner Bros. released The Great J.J. Jackson, which contained four songs from Jackson's Calla Records debut, plus eight others. Later that year, Jackson signed with Congress Records, a subsidiary of Kapp Records, releasing his third album, The Greatest Little Soul Band in the Land, in late 1969. This album reunited Jackson with the English musicians who had contributed to the success of "But It's Alright", in 1966, in particular Dick Morrissey and Terry Smith. For his fourth album, Jackson formed J.J. Jackson's Dilemma, releasing an eponymous album on Perception Records in 1970, recorded in 1969. With some of the same musicians who had been members of J.J. Jackson's Dilemma, Jackson released his fifth and final album (and fourth solo album) ...and proud of it! in 1970, on Perception Records.

Jackson became a permanent resident of England in 1969. That same year, Jackson was the subject of a private publication by artist Nancy Reiner, The Adventures of JJ or How The Greatest Little Soul Band In The Land Jes Grooved and Grooved and Grooved. Reiner was the artist whose sketch of Jimi Hendrix became the cover of The Cry of Love. She had previously created the cover art for albums by Brother Jack McDuff and Jimmy Witherspoon.

Jackson's longtime producer, commencing with his recordings at Calla Records and continuing across subsequent labels, was Lew Futterman. Futterman was also a producer of recordings by Jack McDuff and Jimmy Witherspoon, as well as recordings by the British band If.

In 1975, Jackson released the single "Let Me Try Again", under the Magna-Glide label. The label was owned by Jerry Kasenetz and Jeffry Katz, who had previously been associated with bubblegum music. The single was unique for Jackson, in that long-time producer Lew Futterman was not involved, and Jackson did not contribute to writing the single. The song was written and produced by Robert (Bobby) Flax and Lanny Lambert.

Jackson's recording career largely ceased after 1975. As of the 1990s and into the 2000s, he performed as a member of various "Oldies" tours, involving various artists from the 1950s and 1960s. In 1994 and 1995, he performed at the Greek Theatre with other artists, including Chuck Berry, Mel Carter, Bobby 'Boris' Pickett, Len Barry and Rosie and the Originals. He was included in the 1999 RKO Records release by "Lou Christie and Friends", Rock & Roll Legends Live!, which included performances by Christie and Jackson, as well as Ian Whitcomb, Chris Montez, Jewel Akens, Robert Parker and The Cuff Links In 2002 and 2003, Jackson appeared in revues organized and headlined by Edwin Cook, formerly of the Cornell Gunter version of The Coasters, where others on the bill included Chris Montez, Al Wilson and Otis Day.

Despite Jackson's own lack of recorded output, "But It's Alright" continued to be covered by other artists. In 1981, Australian band Jo Jo Zep & The Falcons covered the song, which was released as a single from their Step Lively album. In 1994, the song was covered by Huey Lewis and the News and included on the album Four Chords & Several Years Ago. The Lewis 1994 cover was also released as a single, including both studio and live versions of the song.

in 1996, Jackson's first album was re-released, on CD in the United Kingdom, by See For Miles Records. It was also re-released in 2005 in the United States, by Collectables Records.

In 2009, The Great J.J. Jackson was re-released, on CD, by Collector's Choice. The re-release included as additional tracks the remaining songs from Jackson's first album on Calla Records that had not been included in the original release of The Great J.J. Jackson. Thus, Jackson's entire first album plus some of his singles released by Loma Records and Warner Bros. Records were included on one album, though a number of Jackson's singles were never included on albums.

Photo of Singer J.J. Jackson, Bassist Richard Campbell and Singer Chuck Negron of Three Dog Night fame from a shared concert in mid 2000's

In 2017, Jackson was included among the performers in Rock and Roll Reunion, produced by TVS Television

There is often confusion between Jerome Louis Jackson, known as J. J. Jackson, and Leo Robinson, who moved to Brazil and later changed his name to J. J. Jackson, at times adding "do Brasil" to his stage name.

== Discography ==
=== Albums ===
==== As J.J. Jackson ====
- 1967: J.J. Jackson, also known as J.J. Jackson With The Greatest Little Soul Band In The Land - But It's Alright (Calla; No. 24, Billboard Hot R&B LPs Chart)
- 1969: The Great J.J. Jackson (Warner Bros.)
- 1969: The Greatest Little Soul Band in the Land (Congress)
- 1970: ...and proud of it! (Perception)

==== As J. J. Jackson's Dilemma ====
- 1970: J. J. Jackson's Dilemma (Perception)

=== Singles ===
==== As J.J. Jackson ====
- 1963: "Shy Guy"/"Time" (Crescent)
- 1966: "But It's Alright"/"Boogaloo Baby" (Calla Records; Billboard Hot 100 No. 22, Billboard Hot Rhythm & Blues Singles Chart No. 4)
- 1966: "But It's Alright"/"Come See Me (I'm Your Man)"/"I Dig Girls/Let It Out" (Fonogram)
- 1966: "It Seems Like I've Been Here Before"/"'Til Love Goes Out of Style" (Calla)
- 1967: "Four Walls (Three Windows and Two Doors)"/"Here We Go Again" (Calla Records; Pop Singles No. 123; R&B Singles No. 17)
- 1967: "I Dig Girls"/"That Ain't Right" (Calla Records; Billboard Hot 100 No. 83, R&B Singles No. 19)
- 1967: "Boogaloo Baby"/"A Change Is Gonna Come"/"Love Is A Hurting Thing"/"Try Me" (Fonogram)
- 1967: "Sho Nuff (Got A Good Thing Going)"/"Try Me" (Loma/Warner Bros.)
- 1968: "Come See Me"/"Try Me" (Strike Records)
- 1968: "Come See Me"/"I Don't Want To Live My Life Alone" (Loma)
- 1968: "Down, But Not Out"/"Why Does It Take So Long?" (Loma/Warner Bros.)
- 1968: "That Ain't Right"/"Courage Ain't Strength" (Loma)
- 1968: "Too Late/You Do It Cause You Wanna" (Warner Bros.)
- 1968: "Courage Ain't Strength"/"Too Late"/"It Seems Like I've Been Here Before"/"You Do It Cause You Wanna" (Warner Bros.)
- 1969: "But It's Alright"/"Ain't Too Proud to Beg" (Warner Bros. Records; Billboard Hot 100 No. 45); No. 63 Canada
- 1969: "That Ain't Right"/"Four Walls (Three Windows and Two Doors)"(Warner Bros.)
- 1969: "But It's Alright"/"Four Walls (Three Windows and Two Doors)"(Warner Bros.)
- 1969: "Pero Esta Bien"/"No Esta Bien" (Warner Bros.)
- 1969: "Fat, Black and Together"/"Fat, Black and Together" (Congress)
- 1970: "Nobody's Gonna Help You (Lessen You Help Yourself)"/"Help Me Get To My Grits" (Perception)
- 1975: "Let Me Try Again"/"When Love Meets Love"(Magna-Glide /London)

==== As J.J. Jackson's Dilemma ====
- 1970: "Bow Down To The Dollar"/"Indian Thing" (RCA Victor)

=== Contributions to other recordings ===
==== As an arranger, conductor ====
- 1966: Brother Jack McDuff, A Change Is Gonna Come (Atlantic)
- 1966: Brother Jack McDuff, Tobacco Road (Atlantic)
- 1966: Windsor King, "I'm Walking Out On Trouble" / "Try Me" (Philips)

==== As a musician ====
- 1970: Brother Jack McDuff, To Seek a New Home (Blue Note); piano, percussion
