= The Fuzz (band) =

American female vocal trio

Background information
- Genres: R&B
- Years active: 1970–1972
- Labels: Calla
- Past members: Sheila Young; Val Williams; Barbara Gilliam; Danielle Angelique Mims

The Fuzz was an American female vocal trio from Washington, D.C. They started out in 1970 as The Passionettes, but changed their name when they signed to Calla Records in 1971. Their self-titled debut, which came out that year, was significant in that it was one of the first "concept" albums by a female artist and interspersed monologues (then referred to as "raps") and musical selections, built around a theme comparing love to the four seasons. Further, most of the songs were written by a group member (Shelia Young). The group had a great influence on the style Love Unlimited would later popularize under the tutelage of Barry White. The single "I Love You for All Seasons" went Top 10 on the US Billboard R&B chart and peaked at #21 on the US Billboard Hot 100. The follow-up single, "Like an Open Door", hit #14 on the R&B chart, and after releasing two more singles with little or no success, they disbanded in 1972. The group reunited in the 1990s and performed at the Art Leboe Concert Hall in California with a new member on September 11, 2010, more than two years after the death of Barbara Gilliam, and with Val Williams and two new members at The WAVE's Love Affair Concert at Honda Center, Anaheim, California on February 11, 2017.

== Members ==
- Sheila Young (born 16 August 1951)
- Val Williams (born 26 March 1951)
- Barbara Gilliam (born 16 August 1952 Washington D.C, USA, died August 4, 2008, Alexandria, Virginia)
- Danielle Angelique Mims

== Discography ==
=== Albums ===
Year	Album	US Pop	US R&B	Record label
1971	The Fuzz	196	43	Calla Records

=== Singles ===
Year	Title	Peak chart positions			Record Label	B-side	Album
Year	Title	US Pop	US R&B	AUS	Record Label	B-side	Album
1970	"Sister Watch Yourself" (as The Passionettes)	—	—	—	Uni Records	"Stand by Your Man"	
1970	"I Love You for All Seasons"	21	10	100	Calla Records	"I Love You for All Seasons" (Instrumental)	The Fuzz
1971	"Like an Open Door"	77	14	—	Calla Records	"Leave It All Behind Me"	The Fuzz
1971	"I'm So Glad"	95	35	—	Calla Records	"All About Love"	The Fuzz
1972	"Mr. Heartaches and Miss Tears"	—	—	—	Calla Records	"Do Just What You Can"	
