= But It's Alright =

Single by J. J. Jackson

from the album But It's Alright
- B-side: "Boogaloo Baby"
- Released: 1966
- Genre: Soul
- Length: 2:55
- Label: Calla
- Songwriter(s): J.J. Jackson, Pierre Tubbs
- Producer(s): Lew Futterman

J. J. Jackson singles chronology
"Shy Guy" (1963)	"But It's Alright" (1966)	"It Seems Like I've Been Here Before" (1966)

"But It's Alright" (aka "It's Alright", due to its lyrics) is a song co-written by J. J. Jackson and Pierre Tubbs that became a hit on the pop and soul charts in both 1966 and 1969.

== Theme ==
The lyrics address the singer's girlfriend, who has broken his heart by cheating on him. But the song keeps a happy, upbeat tone due to the singer's belief in karma: "It's alright" because "you've got to reap what you sow, girl" and she will find herself cheated on as well.

== History ==
Described as being "driven by one of the catchiest guitar hooks in the history of rock & roll and a devastating vocal performance", the song was first released by Calla Records in 1966, as a single and on the album of the same name. Subsequent to acquiring the Calla Records catalogue, Warner Bros.-Seven Arts re-released the song in 1969, as a single and on the album The Great J.J. Jackson.

The single was recorded in the United Kingdom, and was one of the first R & B hit singles to have been recorded in England. The song featured some of Britain's top jazz musicians of the day, including Terry Smith on guitar, Dick Morrissey on tenor sax and John Marshall on drums.

When first released in 1966, the song reached number 22 on the Billboard Hot 100 and number 4 on the Hot R&B Singles chart. When re-released in May 1969, they reached number 45, and remained on the charts for nine weeks. In Canada, it reached number 63. A Spanish language version was also recorded by Jackson and released in 1969.

== Other cover versions ==
- In 1967, Brother Jack McDuff, with David "Fathead" Newman, covered "But It's Alright", as an instrumental version, on their album Double Barrelled Soul. The song was also released as a single.
- It was also covered in 1967 by Eddie Floyd and included on Floyd's album, Knock on Wood.
- In 1969, a version was recorded by Wilmer & the Dukes.
- In 1976 a cover was included on The Best of Redbone by Redbone.
- In 1981, Australian band Jo Jo Zep & The Falcons covered the song, which was released as a single from their Step Lively album.
- In 1994, Huey Lewis and the News covered the song for their album Four Chords & Several Years Ago. It was released as a single, which included the studio version and a live rendition. The single reached number 54 on the Billboard Hot 100 and number 5 on the Adult Contemporary chart. An EP CD single was released in Germany by Elektra Records.
