= I Need Your Lovin' =

"Need Your Lovin'"

Single by Don Gardner and Dee Dee Ford
- B-side: "Tell Me"
- Released: 1962
- Recorded: 1962
- Label: Fire Records
- Songwriters: Bobby Robinson, Don Gardner
- Producer: Bobby Robinson

I Need Your Lovin' (also: "Need Your Lovin'") is a popular rhythm and blues song written by Bobby Robinson and Don Gardner. Gardner, teamed up with singer Dee Dee Ford and scored a Top 20 hit with the song in 1962. The song features a false ending halfway through, and then cranks right back up again. Like much R&B, the song displays a strong gospel influence.

"I Need Your Lovin'" has been covered by many artists including Otis Redding, on his debut 1964 album Pain in My Heart; and Tom Jones (the latter on his Along Came Jones, 1965 debut album). Buckwheat Zydeco included the song on his 1983 album "100% Fortified Zydeco."
