= Calla Records =

American record label

Calla Records was an American independent record label based in New York City, active from approximately 1965 to 1977. The label released soul music and was run by Nate McCalla (1930–1980).

McCalla was an associate and bodyguard for Morris Levy who headed Roulette Records.

Artists recording for the label include J.J. Jackson, Jimmie Raye, The Sandpebbles, Little Jerry Williams (aka Swamp Dogg), Jean Wells, The Emotions, The Fuzz, Lonnie Youngblood, The Persuaders, and Geraldine Hunt among others. Initially distributed by Cameo-Parkway Records, the label became part of Roulette Records. The label was subsequently distributed by Shakat Records, a United States disco label and Epic Records.

In 1968, the Calla Records catalogue was acquired by Warner Bros. Records. The label nonetheless continued, developing new artists, such as The Fuzz, into the early 1970s, and then releasing a number of disco-oriented albums in 1975 and 1976.

Calla Records ceased operations in 1977. McCalla was found murdered, execution style, in 1980, allegedly on the orders of Morris Levy.

== Recordings released on the Calla label ==
- 1965 - "Let Me Down Easy" / "What I Don't Know" - Betty LaVette (Calla C-102)
- 1965 - "I Feel Good (All Over)" / "Only Your Love Can Save Me" - Betty LaVette (Calla C-104)
- 1965 - "Baby, You're My Everything" / "Just What Do You Plan to Do about It" - Little Jerry Williams (Calla C-105)
- 1965 - "Stand Up Like A Man" / "I'm Just A Fool For You" - Betty LaVette (Calla C-106)
- 1966 - "Baby, Bunny (Sugar Honey)" / "Philly Duck" - Little Jerry Williams (Calla C-109)
- 1966 - "If You Ask Me (Because I Love You)" / "Yvonne" - Jerry Williams (Calla C-116)
- 1966 - "Boogaloo Baby" / "But It's Alright" - J.J. Jackson (Calla C-119)
- 1967 - "What's the Matter with You Baby" / "What Do You Plan to Do about It" - Jerry Williams (Calla C-121)
- 1967 - "Love Power" / "Because of Love" - The Sand Pebbles (Calla C-141)
- 1967 - "Run Run Roadrunner" / "I'm in the Danger Zone" - Jerry Williams (Calla MU 1285)
- 1968 - "That'll Get It" / "It's Written All Over Your Face" - Jimmie Raye (Calla) MS 6705A
- 1968 - "Oh Lord, Why Lord?" - Los Pop Tops (Calla C-154)
- 1970 - "I Love You for All Seasons"/"I Love You for All Seasons" (Instrumental) - The Fuzz (Calla C-174)
- 1971 - "Like an Open Door"/"Leave It All Behind Me" - The Fuzz (Calla C-177)
- 1971 - "I'm So Glad"/"All About Love" - The Fuzz (Calla C-179)
- 1971 - The Fuzz - The Fuzz (Calla SC-2001)
- 1976 - "Spirit of '76" - Booty People (Calla CAS-110)
- 1996 - Soul of the '60s: Vol. 1
