= The Beatles' 1964 tour of Australasia =

1964 concert tour by the Beatles

The Beatles' 1964 tour of Australia was a several week tour performed by the British rock band the Beatles as a part of their 1964 world tour. It was their first and only tour of Australia and New Zealand. The tour was notable particularly because Jimmie Nicol had replaced a hospitalised Ringo Starr until the Beatles drummer was able to rejoin the tour from the Melbourne dates onward.

== Tour ==
Negotiations for an Australasian tour started in October 1963, and Epstein signed on 10 January 1964 (a month before the Beatles’ American tour). The price had increased from £1500 to £2500 for a six-day week plus airfares and excess baggage for drums and amps. Epstein kept to the agreement and reluctantly turned down higher offers, including £5,000 per night for five nights from a Tokyo syndicate.

The negotiations between Robert Kerridge of Kerridge Odeon in Auckland, Aztec Services (Kenn Brodziak) in Melbourne, and their London agent Cyril Berlin of The Grade Organisation with Brian Epstein were by telegram (many reproduced in the 2024 book).

The Beatles reportedly made £250,000 from their Australasian tour.

=== The Jimmie Nicol replacement ===
On the morning of 3 June 1964, the day before setting off on a world tour, Ringo Starr fell ill during a photo session. He fainted and was taken to hospital with a strong fever. He was diagnosed with severe tonsillitis, and hospitalized for a few days in London.

The Beatles, especially George Harrison, wanted to postpone the tour, but then the manager Brian Epstein and the producer George Martin after a frantic phone call decided to use drummer Jimmie Nicol to temporarily replace Starr.

When the Beatles asked Nicol during rehearsals how he was doing, his answer was always "It's getting better". The phrase was later used in "Getting Better", a song from the 1967 album Sgt. Pepper's Lonely Hearts Club Band. Years later he confessed that he would have done it for free, but Epstein offered him £2,500 per performance and a £2,500 bonus. "I couldn't sleep that night, I was one of the fucking Beatles!" he said in a 1988 interview.

The next day, 4 June 1964, there was a show in Copenhagen, Denmark and with the Beatles he did more shows, until Starr, recovered, joined the group in Melbourne, Australia, on 14 June.

Nicol, with a very shy character, was unable to say goodbye to the group and left at night while they were sleeping. At the airport, Brian Epstein handed him £500 and a gold watch with the inscription "From The Beatles and Brian Epstein to Jimmie - with appreciation and gratitude". On the return journey on the plane he was very sad, saying he felt "like a bastard child rejected by his new family".

== Chronology ==
The Beatles gave two concerts in Hong Kong on 9 June. From Hong Kong they flew to Sydney via Manila by BOAC, but did not disembark there. Because of opposing headwinds, their plane had to land for refuelling at Darwin. There they were welcomed at 2 am by 600 shrieking fans.

The Beatles' flight touched down at Sydney Airport just before 7:45am on Thursday June 11, 1964. Paul had a 22nd birthday party in Sydney, with a newspaper competition to choose 15 girl invitees.

Next, following a day of rest in Sydney, the Beatles landed in Adelaide, and 12,000 tickets were sold out in just over five hours for four shows there, two each on 12 and 13 June. There had been doubts about the Adelaide venue delaying confirmation of concerts there.

During their stay in Melbourne, crowds spilled out from the 45,000 (at the time) capacity Festival Hall for three nights in a row. During the entire course of the world tour, crowds sometimes topped six figures.

Between 18–20 June 1964, the Beatles performed six concerts at the Sydney Stadium in Rushcutters Bay.

The Beatles flew from Sydney to Wellington on 21 June. There they complained because the sound volume was too low, and the police filled the entire front row with po-faced coppers.

They flew to Auckland on 24 June, to Dunedin via Wellington, and then from Dunedin to Christchurch on 27 June (where some eggs were thrown at them). On 28 June they flew from Christchurch to Sydney and to Brisbane for their last concert.

Two of the Beatles had relations (second or third cousins) in New Zealand; John and Ringo. George knew neighbours from Liverpool who had emigrated in 1961; he had once babysat for them.

== Legacy ==
In 2014, as a 50 year anniversary, the Australian Broadcasting Corporation released a program about the tour.

Taylor Swift's success in Australia has also been compared to the tour.

== Sources ==
- Armstrong, Greg; Neill, Andy (2024). When We Was Fab: Inside the Beatles Australasian Tour 1964. Woodslane Press, Warriewood NSW, Australia. ISBN 978-1-922800-68-8.
