= Ben Essing =

1960s music promoter

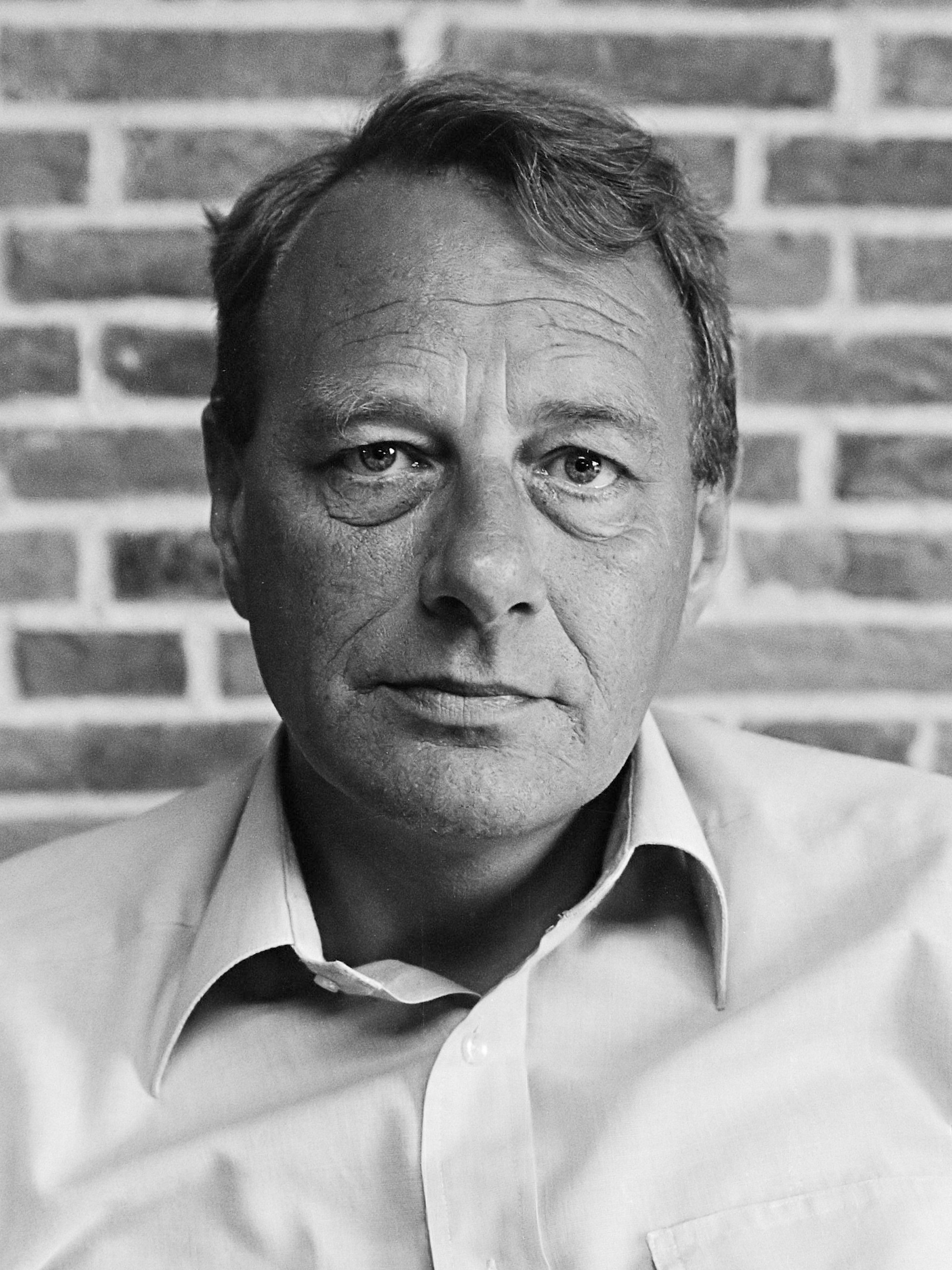
Ben Essing (1979)

Ben Essing (22 April 1934 – 15 February 1994) was a Dutch impresario from Blokker, Netherlands. The son of the town's mayor, he was instrumental in getting a number of international acts to play in the local auction hall where ordinarily produce was sold, most notably The Beatles, who played two shows there during their 1964 world tour, their only concerts in the Netherlands.

== Biography ==
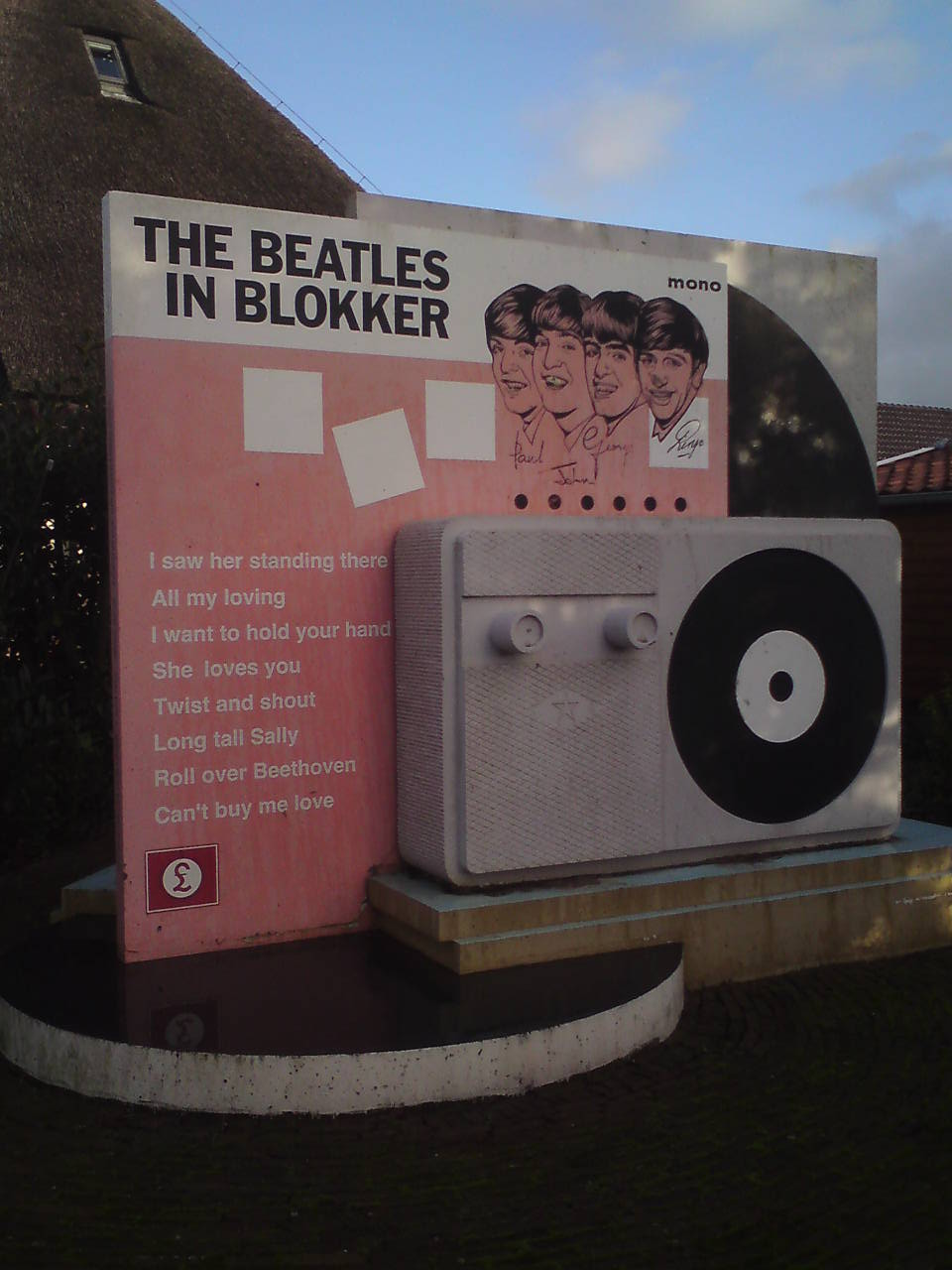
Monument for The Beatles, Blokker

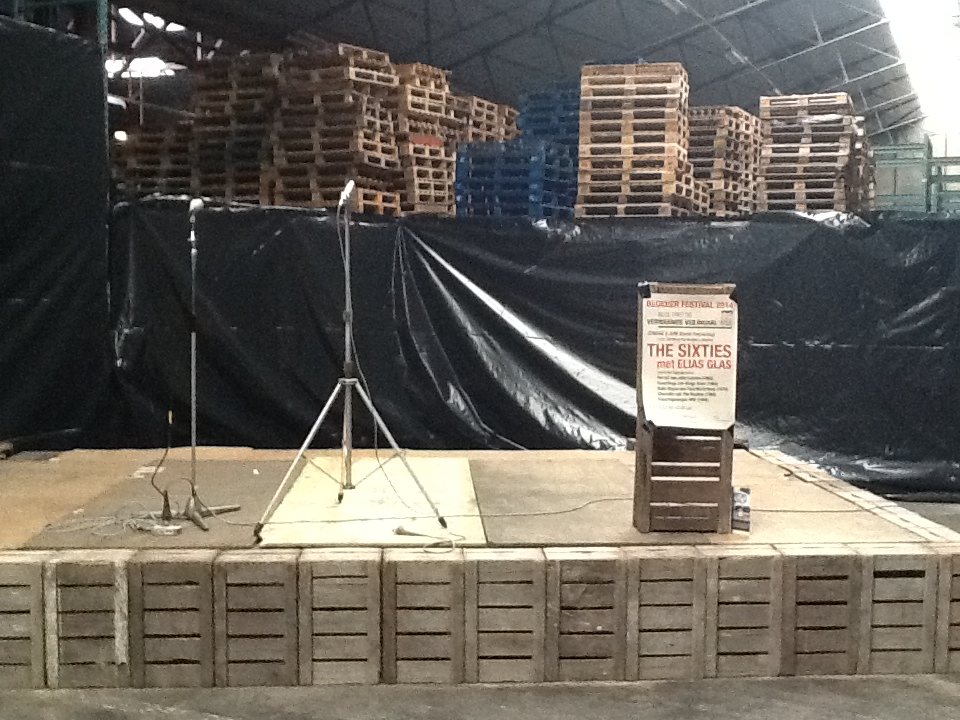
Stage for The Beatles 1964 show in Blokker, made with produce crates. Rebuilt for 50th anniversary, 2014. Photo Nellie Besseling.

Essing was born in Dirkshorn, a small village near Schagen in North Holland. His father was a gemeentesecretaris, formerly the head of a municipality's civil servants, and later became mayor of Blokker. In 1956, he was a law student and the president of the local Catholic youth club; to raise money for the club he got the Dutch Swing College Band, at the time the best-known Dixieland band in the country, to play in Op Hoop van Zegen, Blokker's auction hall—his father was the president of the auction. In years following, other major acts to play there included Benny Goodman, Victor Silvester, and Cliff Richard.

Louis Armstrong, in 1959, was perhaps the biggest international artist Essing got to play in Blokker until The Beatles, as a fundraiser for the youth club's club house. Essing, only 25 at the time, raised money from local farmers to pay Armstrong, who canceled two shows elsewhere to come to Blokker and was apparently quite touched by the idea. He commented afterward, "They didn't seem to know my music, but they were terribly grateful that I came. Man, I hope those kids get their clubhouse". Armstrong and his orchestra played for four hours but were asked to stop: it was getting late and the town did not have accommodations for the ten thousand people who had come from all over the Netherlands and Belgium.

His biggest coup was, undoubtedly, engaging The Beatles for two shows on 6 June 1964. As part of their 1964 world tour, which supported the release of A Hard Day's Night, they spent three days in the Netherlands, a stay that included a (playback) concert for television and a boat tour of the Amsterdam canals. For this leg of the world tour Ringo Starr, who had collapsed during a photo shoot, had been replaced by Jimmie Nicol. Essing paid 40,000 guilders for the band to play two shows, of 24 minutes and 8 songs each. The event continues to live on in the local imagination: a Beatles in Blokker monument was raised in 1999, and in 2014 the fiftieth anniversary was celebrated with an exhibition.

After The Beatles, Essing founded a booking agency for dance orchestras in Alkmaar, and had a brief and disappointing career in real estate. He returned to booking shows and organizing events, including a number of very successful fundraisers for Dutch television. After being implicated in supposed irregularities with the proceeds from such an event in 1974, he left the Netherlands for Belgium, returning for another event in 1989. When he died in Alkmaar in 1994, he had been mostly forgotten.
