= Flamingo Club =

The Flamingo Club has been the name of several notable places of entertainment:

- Flamingo Club (London) in the UK
- Flamingo Las Vegas in Las Vegas, Nevada, USA
- Flamingo Club (Michigan) in Idlewild, Michigan, USA
