= Tony Hall (music executive) =

British music business executive (1928–2019)

Anthony Salvin Hall (1 April 1928 – 26 June 2019) was a British music business executive, columnist, record producer, TV presenter and radio disc jockey.

== Biography ==
Hall was born in Avening, Gloucestershire, and was educated at Lancing College. After National Service, he started working at the Feldman Swing Club (later The 100 Club) in Oxford Street, London, where he became a regular host and met many of the leading jazz musicians of the day. In 1952, he started working for Jeffrey Kruger at the Flamingo Club, and in 1954 started working as an A&R man for Decca Records.

He soon took responsibility for reviving the subsidiary Tempo label, and produced sessions by jazz players such as Ronnie Scott, Tubby Hayes, Dizzy Reece and Victor Feldman for the label. The Tempo label was discontinued in 1961. As part of his work for Decca, Hall also presented regular sponsored pop music programmes on Radio Luxembourg during the late 1950s and 1960s, and was one of the hosts on the Oh Boy! TV show. In the 1960s, Hall contributed a regular column to the pop music weekly Record Mirror, which Decca owned. He also managed the promotion and distribution of Atlantic Records product in the UK, compered concerts at the Saville Theatre in London, and promoted Ike and Tina Turner's "River Deep – Mountain High", a record which had failed in the US but became a major hit in the UK.

Hall left Decca in 1967, and formed the UK's first independent promotion company, Tony Hall Enterprises, which was responsible for promoting acts including Jimi Hendrix, Joe Cocker, and Black Sabbath, whom he signed to the Vertigo label. He then moved into management, guiding the careers of The Real Thing, Loose Ends, and Lynden David Hall in the 1980s and 1990s. He wrote for Jazzwise magazine till 2018.

He died in 2019, aged 91.
