= Michel Stokx =

Belgian serial killer (1942-2001)

- Born: 1942; Lochristi, Belgium
- Died: 25 September 2001 (aged 58–59); Beverwijk, Netherlands
- Conviction: Murder
- Penalty: 20 years in prison

Details
- Victims: 3–6
- Span of crimes: 1989–1991
- Country: Netherlands (possibly Belgium and France)

Michel Stokx (1942 – 25 September 2001) was a Belgian serial killer who worked as a truck driver in Assen, Netherlands.

On 27 July 1991, he lured 11-year-old Jessica Laven from Blokker out of a swimming pool in Zwaag. Later she was found strangled in Bad Nieuweschans. During his interrogation, Stokx also confessed to abusing and murdering two German boys, 13-year-old Marco Weisser from Wiesbaden on 23 July 1989, and 10-year-old Salim Thattil from Neustadt an der Weinstraße c. 16 August 1990.

There are also persistent rumours that Stokx is responsible for the death of 10-year-old Belgian girl Nathalie Geijsbregts. Sjaak H., a member of the Venlo Gang, claimed that Stokx would have told him if that were true. He was also questioned as a suspect in the murder of Cheryl Morriën from IJmuiden but he denied any involvement.

In addition, his name is mentioned in connection to the murder of 10-year-old Anaïs Marcelli in Mulhouse in France.

For the murders of Laven, Weisser and Thattil, Michel Stokx was sentenced to 20 years in prison in November 1992 and he was detained in the Scheveningen Penitentiary. A few months before his death there was a stir in the Netherlands when it turned out that he received a disability benefit in prison.

On 18 September 2001, during his work therapy, he knocked over a bottle of turpentine and banged a fluorescent tube, causing a fire. More than 60% of his body was burned severely and he was transported to the burn center in Beverwijk. He died there on 25 September. The parents of Jessica Laven were pleased with the news. According to the police, it was an accident, but the media speculated it was an assassination attempt or suicide. However, the authorities refuted these claims.

== See also ==
- List of serial killers by country
