= Jeffrey Kruger =

British entertainment business executive

- Born: Jeffrey Sonny Krugerkoff; 19 April 1931; London, England
- Died: 14 May 2014 (aged 83); Miami, Florida, United States
- Occupations: Nightclub owner; music publisher; record company owner; music business executive; film producer
- Known for: Owner of Flamingo Club and Ember Records

Jeffrey Sonny Kruger MBE (né Krugerkoff, 19 April 1931 –14 May 2014) was a British entertainment business executive who owned the Flamingo Club in Soho, London, established the independent record label Ember Records, and set up the music business conglomerate TKO (The Kruger Organisation).

== Biography ==
Kruger was born in the East End of London in 1931; his father changed the family's German name of Krugerkoff to Kruger during the Second World War. He started work as a salesman with Columbia Pictures. He aspired to be a jazz pianist and performed in nightclubs, before forming his own band, Sonny Kruger and the Music Makers. With his father, Sam Kruger, he founded the Flamingo Club in Soho in 1952, initially in Coventry Street; it moved to Wardour Street in 1957.

He established contacts in the US, and persuaded jazz drummer Tony Crombie to form one of the earliest British rock and roll bands, Tony Crombie and the Rockets. Kruger acted as Crombie's manager and record producer, and co-produced the movie Rock You Sinners in 1957. The Flamingo Club became established as a venue for leading American and British jazz performers, and in the early 1960s jazz-influenced rhythm and blues bands such as Georgie Fame and the Blue Flames performed there regularly. The club became a centre of the mod subculture, and by the mid-1960s a regular venue for emerging rock bands. Kruger also set up other clubs such as the Florida.

By the late 1950s, Kruger had established his own music publishing, talent and management agencies. In 1960 he founded the independent Ember record label which, as well as recording British acts, distributed many American and other recordings in the UK, including those of Glen Campbell. Kruger also organised British and European tours by many successful American performers including Gladys Knight, Marvin Gaye and Barry White. In the 1970s and 1980s he actively promoted country music and performers including Johnny Cash, Kris Kristofferson and Tammy Wynette. He expanded his operations in the US, and established TKO in 1979. He later concentrated on promoting many dance and theatre productions.

He published an autobiography, Angels & Assholes: My Life With The Stars, in 1999. He was awarded the MBE in 2002, for his services to music. He died in Miami, Florida in 2014 at the age of 83.

His son Howard Kruger is also a successful concert and tour promoter, and music and entertainment business executive.

== External list ==
- Jeffrey Kruger discography at Discogs
- Jeffrey Kruger at IMDb
