= Maori Hi Five =

The Maori Hi Five or Hi Five were a New Zealand Māori singing group, described as a seven-piece show band formed in the late 1950s in Wellington, which performed traditional New Zealand dances and songs as well as "pop" music.

The members in 1964 were Wes Epae, Kawana Pohe, Paddy Te Tai, Robert Hemi, Solomon Pohatu and Mary McMullan née Nimmo. They had completed a date in Singapore and were to play the floor show for a month at the Nine Dragons Supper Club then to an engagement in Las Vegas. On 9 June 1964 they appeared with the Beatles, performing for all the first half of the first (7.30 pm) concert in Hong Kong (there was also a 9.30 pm concert). See The Beatles' 1964 world tour.
