= Kenn Brodziak =

Australian producer (1913–1999)

Kenn Brodziak OBE
- Brodziak in his Melbourne Office in 1998
- Born: Kenneth Leo Brodziak; 31 May 1913; Waverley, New South Wales, Australia
- Died: 3 June 1999 (aged 86); Melbourne, Victoria, Australia
- Other name: Richard R. Raymond
- Occupations: Entrepreneur; theatre and concert promoter; producer; artist manager
- Years active: 1945–1980
- Known for: Aztec Services
- Awards: JC Williamson Award

Kenneth Leo Brodziak OBE (31 May 1913 – 3 June 1999), known early in his career as Richard R. Raymon and nicknamed "Mr Show Business", was an Australian entrepreneur, theatre and concert promoter, producer and artist manager. His career lasted from the mid-1940s until his retirement in 1980.

== Life and career ==
Kenn Brodziak was born in the Sydney suburb of Waverley, of Polish-Jewish extraction. His family wanted him to have a law career, and he studied law for five years but he did not graduate. He was more interested in the theatre and wrote plays in his spare time.

Brodziak joined the RAAF when war broke out, and trained in Canada as a navigator under the Empire Air Training Scheme. He served in was in Coastal Command in England and, when on leave in London’s theatreland, he got tips on theatrical management from stars such as Jack Warner and Vivien Leigh.

He started his career in 1945 as an assistant producer on the local vaudeville circuit. Over his long career, through his company Aztec Services, based at 289 Flinders Lane, Melbourne (1946–1979), and subsequently through J. C. Williamson Productions (1976–1980), he arranged concerts and tours by a wide range of local and international acts, including Winifred Atwell, Gene Pitney, Marlene Dietrich, The Kinks, Sophie Tucker, Normie Rowe, Carol Channing, The Seekers, The Easybeats, Pat Boone, Fabian, Sid James, Cilla Black, The Dave Clark Five, Duane Eddy, Robert Morley, Bob Dylan, Lonnie Donegan, Cliff Richard, Dave Brubeck, Marcel Marceau, Eartha Kitt and Jack Benny.

A 1954 tour by Ted Heath and his orchestra was a logistical and financial disaster for Brodziak and his Sydney associate John (Jack) Neary (who lost his house). A lesson for the pair was a tour by Sam Snyders’ Fabulous American Water Follies in 1956. The show lost £23,000 in Sydney’s White City Stadium in ten days, but recovered those losses in Melbourne, Adelaide and Perth, showing that what played in Melbourne might not necessarily go down well in Sydney and vice versa. Consequently, Jack Neary looked after New South Wales and Queensland promotions, and Kenn Brodziak looked after Victoria and South Australia.

His bringing of the BBC's Black and White Minstrel Show to Australia and New Zealand for an intended six-month tour was an unprecedented success, eventually lasting for over for three years from 1962 to 1965 and breaking box office records in both countries which still stand. He was also the second manager of singer John Farnham and cast him in local versions of the musicals Charlie Girl and Pippin.

Brodziak's major competitor was Harry M. Miller in Sydney, but he subsequently joined with Brodziak to form Miller-Aztec Stadiums, which promoted tours by the Animals and the Monkees, and the "Big Show Tour" of 1968 headlined by rock group the Who.

== The Beatles' Australian tour ==
Brodziak's most notable achievement was acting as agent for Dick Lean and Stadiums Limited in securing the Beatles' 16-day Australian tour in 1964 during their world tour. In 1963, he was directed by Lean to see the Beatles perform during a talent-scouting trip to Britain and, just prior to the explosion of Beatlemania in Australia ,agreed to handle and promote the group's Australian tour for Stadiums Limited, which owned most of the suitable capital city venues, including the Brisbane Festival Hall, the Festival Hall in Melbourne, Centennial Hall in Adelaide and Sydney Stadium. By the time the Beatles arrived in Australia they had become international stars, having already scored 12 hits in the Australian charts, and the tour was a huge success. In 1998, he acknowledged that, in spite of his many other achievements, helping bring the Beatles to Australia was probably the most memorable:

"It used to annoy me that people only knew me for bringing The Beatles here. Now I realise what a landmark moment that was. There will never be another group like them."

== Theatre productions ==
Later in his career, though Brodziak continued to book concerts, he concentrated on producing stage shows. They included the successful Australian productions of The Boys in the Band, Godspell, Pippin, Hair and A Chorus Line. One of his assistants was Shane Hewitt. After retiring in 1980, Brodziak concentrated on adding to and developing his extensive collection of showbiz memorabilia.

== Honours ==
Brodziak was appointed an Officer of the Order of the British Empire (OBE) in 1978 for services to theatre. In 1998, along with Edna Edgley, he received the JC Williamson Award for lifetime achievement.

Brodziak died in Melbourne on 3 June 1999, aged 86 years.

== Sources ==
- Armstrong, Greg; Neill, Andy (2024). When We Was Fab: Inside the Beatles Australasian Tour 1964. Warriewood NSW, Australia: Woodslane Press. ISBN 978-1-922800-68-8.
