= Rhythm and Blues at the Flamingo =

- Cover of the 1984 RSO Records re-issue

Live album by Georgie Fame
- Released: January 1964
- Recorded: Wednesday, 25 September 1963, The Flamingo, 33 Wardour Street, London
- Genre: Rhythm and blues
- Length: 35:08
- Label: Columbia
- Producer: Ian Samwell

Professional ratings
Review scores
Source	Rating
Record Mirror	4/5 stars

Rhythm and Blues at the Flamingo is a live rhythm and blues album recorded by Georgie Fame and the Blue Flames at the Flamingo Club in September 1963 and released by Columbia Records in 1964. It was the first album on which Fame appeared.

In the early 1960s Georgie Fame and the Blue Flames were resident at a number of London clubs including The Flamingo and the club's manager Rik Gunnell managed the group. On this recording Gunnell's younger brother Johnny can be heard announcing the songs over the noisy club clientele.

The album was produced by Ian Samwell, engineered by Glyn Johns and released on the Columbia label (Columbia 33SX 1599). It failed to chart and the single "Do The Dog", taken from the album and released in the same year, was also commercially unsuccessful.

The vinyl album was re-issued in 1984 on the RSO Records label (RSO SLELP-80), with cover notes by Johnny Gunnell. Gunnell noted: "To Do The Dog involves distinctly sensuous body movements and even the most cooly [sic?] suburban members of the audience could not fail to be moved to an almost jungle like frenzy."

== Track listing ==
Side one
No.	Title	Writer(s)	Length
1.	"Night Train"	Jimmy Forrest, Oscar Washington, Lewis P. Simpkins	4.33
2.	"Let the Good Times Roll"	Sam Theard, Fleecie Moore	2.53
3.	"Do the Dog"	Rufus Thomas	3.29
4.	"Eso Beso"	Joe Sherman, Noel Sherman	2.47
5.	"Work Song"	Nat Adderley - incorrectly credited to "Allison"	2.51

Side two
No.	Title	Writer(s)	Length
6.	"Parchman Farm"	Mose Allison	3.06
7.	"You Can't Sit Down"	Dee Clark, Phil Upchurch, Cornell Muldrow	4.54
8.	"Humpty Dumpty"	Eric "Monty" Morris	3.29
9.	"Shop Around"	Berry Gordy, Smokey Robinson	3.46
10.	"Baby, Please Don't Go"	Big Joe Williams	3.17

Do The Dog
An audio sample of "Do The Dog"

== Personnel ==
=== Musicians ===
- Georgie Fame - vocals, Hammond organ
- Johnny Marshall - baritone saxophone
- Michael Eve - tenor saxophone
- Big Jim Sullivan - electric guitar
- Rod "Boots" Slade - bass guitar
- Red Reece - drums
- Tommy Thomas - conga drums

=== Technical ===
- Produced by Ian Samwell
- Engineered by Glyn Johns
- Sleeve notes (1984 re-issue) by Johnny Gunnell
