= Ember Records (UK label) =

British record label

Ember Records was a British independent record label established by Jeffrey Kruger.

== 1950s to 1960s ==
Ember Records was founded in the late 1950s, by avid jazz fan Jeffrey Kruger, owner of the Flamingo Jazz Club. At the time, the British music industry was largely dominated by four major record companies (EMI, Decca, Pye and Philips) who, thanks to the lack of a national popular music radio station, dominated the airwaves by buying slots on Radio Luxembourg. Therefore, the only way independent record labels could achieve any success was by focusing on specialist genres.

Kruger realised that considerable success could be gained if, rather than focusing on one specific musical genre, he instead focused on a plethora of them. Releases under the jazz, pop, R&B, beat, soul, rockabilly, and other genres followed, and Kruger started to establish Ember as a major independent force in the UK. As Kruger explained:

I had the publishing on a Continental hit called ‘Banjo Boy’ sung by Jan & Kjeld, two teenage Danish boys. I got it covered by several artists but my contract stipulated that I had to secure a British release for the original version. None of the majors would touch it so I designed labels myself, had 250 45rpm singles pressed on a converted button press in Dagenham, and my Ember label was born. I didn’t know how you were supposed to distribute records so I drove round dozens of independent record shops selling them myself. Then I went down to BBC radio who reluctantly agreed to give it some airplay, and before I knew it distributors around the country were phoning me for copies of the single and we had a Top 40 hit.

The first major achievement and breakthrough for the label came when Kruger realised the rising demand for American music acts in Britain and that some popular American labels had not yet had a publishing deal in the UK, despite the major British labels already having deals with the most important ones. Kruger flew out to the US and made deals with, amongst others, 20th Century Fox (a major coup for an independent at the time), Sam Phillips, Harry Simeone Chorale’s ‘Onward Christian Soldiers’ label and Syd Nathan, boss of King and Federal Records in Ohio.

As Kruger recalled:

Syd was a small, heavy set man, kindly but shrewd. He met me at the airport and the first thing he did was to whisk me off to a World series baseball game where I tried not to look too bored! Eventually, after the game was over, we got down to business. I couldn’t afford big advances in those days and told him so but I think he saw in me some of my enthusiasm and chutzpah that he’d had as a young man, and he agreed to lease me some singles by Earl Bostic, the Platters and a few more. I sent him regular statements and (modest) royalty cheques, he leased albums by Bill Ward’s Dominoes, James Brown, Billy Eckstine and other top artists to Ember, and our relationship carried on happily for several years.

Becoming the first British label to set up its own distribution and pressing facilities helped Ember cement their place in the industry. By 1963, Ember had built up a roster of UK artists such as Matt Monro, the Dale Sisters, Grant Tracy and the Sunsets, and the duo John Shakespeare and Ken Hawker (recording as Carter, Lewis & the Southerners). The next big break came when composer, producer and arranger John Barry left EMI to join Kruger. During his time with Ember, he scored hits with pioneering folk duo Chad & Jeremy, and "Christine" by "Miss X" (Joyce Blair), a song which referred to the Profumo scandal.

As the decade wore on, the label continued to release records from across the musical spectrum, from film and TV themes such as the Liars (which established a young Nyree Dawn Porter), to the soul 45 rpm singles for which the label became renowned. These featured acts such as The Casinos, the Checkmates and Lou Lawton, Stax hitmakers the Bar-Kays, King Curtis and the Pac-Keys.

On the recommendation of John Abbey, who set up the subsidiary soul label Speciality where some of those previous releases first appeared, Kruger gave a debut to Glen Campbell, the man who would go on to become Ember’s biggest success. Despite a considerable investment from Kruger, however, they struggled to achieve success, at least initially.

"Glen seemed to specialise in songs about unfashionable American Towns”, recalls Kruger. “So it was no surprise that his next 45, and Ember’s first release of 1969, was called ‘Wichita Lineman’. What was a surprise was that this time we hit the jackpot. The record was unstoppable, hitting the Top Ten and sparking off a string of hit singles and LP’s for Glen.

It was around this time that the label became the first British independent label to have three of its singles at the top of the American charts.

== 1970s to present ==
In the early 1970s, the label released recordings by Julie Rogers and Susan Maughan, and helped the career of Avengers actress Linda Thorson, in a similar fashion to what had happened with Twiggy a few years earlier.

In 1979, after Kruger had continued to put out a substantial number of soul releases by artists such as Ed Robinson, Tony and the Tyrones and golden oldies such as Gladys Knight, as well as new albums by PJ Proby and Johnny Otis, the label entered a less active period. By this stage, Kruger was involved with a number of other businesses in the music industry, being a concert promoter among other activities, and felt he could no longer meet the time restraints of running a label.

In 2009, Fantastic Voyage, a subsidiary of the Future Noise record label, started releasing a series of albums focused on the various genres Ember had promoted. This was to coincide with the fiftieth anniversary of the first Ember release and the thirtieth anniversary of the last. In 2016, the Ember catalogue moved to Cherry Red Records in the UK.

Jeffrey Kruger died in Florida in May 2014, aged 83.
