= The Dale Sisters =

English vocal trio

- Also known as: The England Sisters
- Born: Betty: 1939; Hazel: 1942; Julie: 1941; Goole, Yorkshire, England
- Genres: Traditional pop
- Years active: 1959–1963
- Labels: Ember

The Dale Sisters were an English vocal trio, who had limited chart success in the early 1960s. They are best remembered for their recordings of "Heartbeat" and "My Sunday Baby (un Telegrama)", both of which became minor hits in the UK Singles Chart. Other songs they sang included "Billy Boy, Billy Boy", "Road to Love" and "All My Life". Their work, when they were billed by their alternative name of The England Sisters, was arranged by John Barry.

They were born in Goole, Yorkshire, as Betty, Hazel and Julie Dunderdale, a name they later shortened to become the Dale Sisters. In July 1959, they won a talent contest which was organised by The People, at Butlins, Filey. Later that year they made their first London appearance at the Lyceum Theatre. They were on the bill with Helen Shapiro and The Brook Brothers at the Odeon Theatre, Halifax on 7 April 1962, as part of a national tour. In January 1963, they played the Two Red Shoes Ballroom, Elgin, Scotland, just a week after The Beatles appeared there. Their UK television show appearances included Thank Your Lucky Stars with Adam Faith, John Leyton, The Brooks Brothers, Geoff Goddard and Dion in 1961.

The Dale Sisters tracks "My Sunday Baby (un Telegrama)" and "All My Life" appeared on the compilation album, Say When – Ember Sixties Pop Vol. 1 1960-1961.

They are not to be confused with a similar named, latter day American singing group composed of Ann, Lorri, Lynne, and Amy Dale.

== Members ==
- Elizabeth (Betty) Dunderdale (born 1939, Goole, Yorkshire, England)
- Hazel Read Dunderdale (born 1942, Goole, Yorkshire, England)
- Julie Dunderdale-Smith (born 1941, Goole, Yorkshire, England)

== Discography ==
Date	A-side	B-side	Record label – catalogue reference	UK Singles Chart	Notes
February 1960	"Little Child"	"Heartbeat"	His Master's Voice – POP 710	33	Billed as The England Sisters
August 1960	"The Kiss"	"Billy Boy, Billy Boy"	His Master's Voice – POP 781	-	
October 1961	"My Sunday Baby (un Telegrama)"	"All My Life"	Ember Records – EMBS 140	36	
April 1962	"Road to Love"	"Secrets"	Ember – EMBS 151	-	
