= Lotus (Australian band) =

Australian 1970s rock, pop band

- Origin: Sydney, Australia
- Genres: Rock; pop; hard rock
- Years active: 1970–1973
- Labels: EMI/Parlophone

Lotus were a short-lived Australian rock, pop band formed in 1970. They are a one-hit wonder with their sole release, "Lotus 1 (I'll Be Gone)" (December 1970), reaching No. 33 on the Go-Set National Top 60 in the following May. It was co-written by band members Kim Dawson (lead guitar, vocals), Ian Every (bass guitar, vocals), Shane Hewitt (lead vocals), Ray Smedley (drums) and Warwick Wilkes (organ, vocals). The group underwent line-up changes but issued no more material and disbanded in August 1973.

== History ==
Lotus were formed in Sydney as a rock, pop group in early 1970 by Kim Dawson on lead guitar and vocals, Ian Every on bass guitar and vocals, Shane Hewitt on lead vocals, Ray Smedley on drums and Warwick Wilkes on organ and vocals. The members lived together on a farm on Sydney's then-outer fringe to grow their own food. They relocated to Melbourne, where they issued their sole single, "Lotus 1 (I'll Be Gone)" (December 1970). Australian musicologist Ian McFarlane describes it as an "impressive hard rock" track, with the band members as "somewhere between minor pop star status and the dedicated progressive rock devotee". "Lotus 1" is co-written by all the band's members. It peaked at No. 33 on the Go-Set National Top 60 in the following May. In the next month the group disbanded.

Dawson and Wilkes briefly performed in Melbourne-based hard rock group, the Ash. Dawson, Smedley and Wilkes returned to Sydney where they recruited Norm Roue on slide guitar (ex-Gutbucket) and Billy Rylands on bass guitar (ex-Freshwater) to reform Lotus in late 1971. Roue and Rylands soon left and Every returned to Lotus in 1972. They remained together until August 1973, when they disbanded again.

== Afterwards ==
Shane Hewitt became an entrepreneur in 1973 and joined talent promoter Kenn Brodziak's theatre production team. In 1998 Hewitt resumed performing in cabaret and formed an online CD sales business.
