= Festival Hall (Melbourne) =

Concert and sporting venue in West Melbourne, Victoria, Australia

- The House of Stoush
- Interactive map of Festival Hall
- Former names: West Melbourne Stadium; Melbourne Stadium; The Stadium
- Location: 300 Dudley St, West Melbourne, Victoria, 3003
- Coordinates: 37°48′40″S 144°56′47″E
- Operator: Live Nation Australia
- Capacity: 5,405

Construction
- Groundbreaking: Sept 1913
- Opened: Nov 1913
- Cost: £10,000 (1956 rebuild £150,000)
- Architect: Frank Stapley
- Builder: J.D.McBride

Festival Hall is a heritage listed entertainment venue located at 300 Dudley Street in West Melbourne, Victoria. Festival Hall first opened its doors in 1913 as a boxing arena. It later became a popular music performance venue.

== History ==
The site began its sporting history as the West Melbourne Stadium (shortened to The Stadium) in 1913, developed by Reginald Leslie Baker, the Sydney boxing promoter, opening just in time for the Mehegan-Wells fight of 3 November 1913. In 1915 it came under the control of John Wren (chairman) and Dick Lean (general manager) of Stadiums Limited as a multi-function venue for boxing and pro wrestling. It quickly became known to locals as "the House of Stoush", as over the years it has featured some of the greatest names in Australian boxing including Lionel Rose, Johnny Famechon, Anthony Mundine, Lester Ellis and Barry Michael. Professional wrestling also featured regularly, as did Roller Derby, ballroom dancing, cultural and religious gatherings and the first Indoor Tennis Exhibition featuring John McEnroe. It was used by the Painters and Dockers as a meeting place. During the Great Depression, unemployed men seeking work would gather at Festival Hall to be picked for dock work.

The Stadium was destroyed by fire in 1955 but was rebuilt in time for the 1956 Olympics, where it was used for boxing, basketball and gymnastics events.

Dick Lean Jnr (son of the original general manager, Dick Lean) joined Stadiums in 1960 and set about successful promotion of major music acts of all genres from both the UK and US, increasing the use of the venue significantly. The Stadium was renamed Festival Hall in the early 1960s to reflect its increasing use as Melbourne's largest live entertainment venue at the time. Lean booked the Beatles to play Australia in 1964. Lean continued to promote and bring to Australia many of the major headline acts during the 1960s, 1970s and 1980s.

The Living End's Live at Festival Hall was filmed there on 19 May 2006.

On 30 January 2008, Rage Against the Machine performed at the venue in what was only their second headline show outside the United States since their breakup in September 2000.

Festival Hall's versatile set-up has been used for many events including a weekly conversion into a television studio for the production of The Price is Right for the Seven Network. The venue has also been used for black tie dinners, product launches, conferences, motivation sessions, art exhibitions, large Christmas parties, religious and cultural events, and even as an examination venue for Swinburne University.

In January 2018, Stadiums Australia proposed that the site becomes a pair of apartment towers while retaining the front facade, with the intention of selling the project, saying it could no longer compete with other newer venues. A subsequent nomination to the State heritage body Heritage Victoria was successful, with the site gaining permanent heritage protection in November 2018.

On 25 October 2020 Hillsong Church announced they had purchased Festival Hall with the intention to continue running the venue as a community entertainment venue, as well as to use it for Hillsong Church Services on Sundays. Stadium Pty Ltd was voluntarily liquidated and formally wound up in July 2021.

In March 2023, Live Nation took over operations for the venue.

== Configurations ==
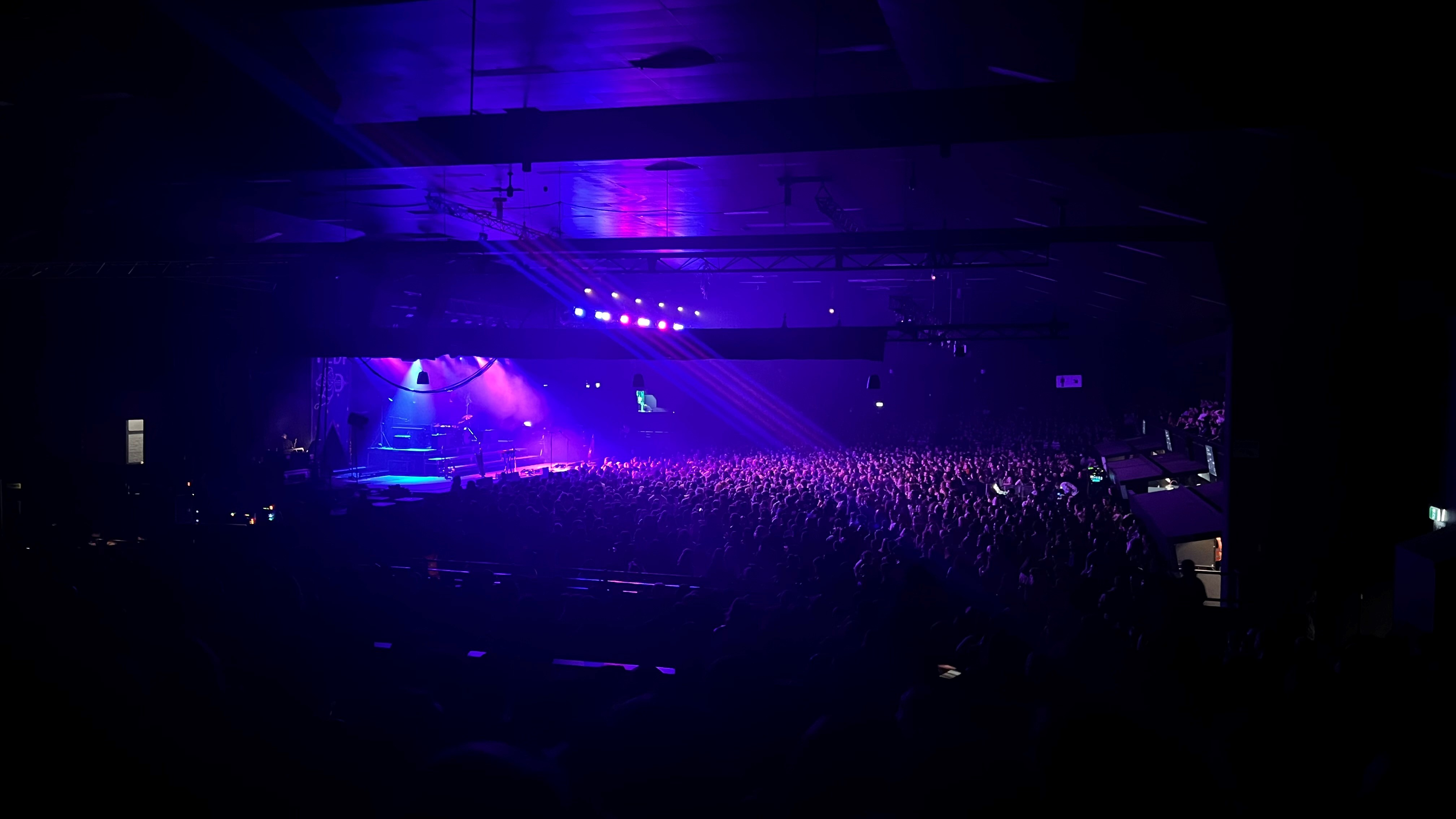
Festival Hall in concert configuration (July 2024)

Prior to renovation, Festival Hall is used for seated events of up to 4,586 including the main floor or for up to 5,445 if the floor is used for standing, sight lines permitting. The addition of floor-to-ceiling curtains around the main floor and between the side sections allows seating for up to 1,741 people or 2,600 standing on the main floor. The main floor has an area of 288 square metres (3,100 sq ft), providing room for dining for up to 1,000 seated guests plus dance floor, and the stage offers a further 160 square metres (1,700 sq ft) of elevated space.

== Notable appearances ==
The Beatles played at the venue during their 1964 World Tour. Ringo Starr rejoined the group for two shows after he had been hospitalized with tonsillitis, during which time he was temporarily replaced by Jimmie Nicol.

Ike & Tina Turner performed at Festival Hall during their first Australian tour on 27 February 1975.

On 19 January 2007, Comedy Rock duo Tenacious D performed as part of their Pick of Destiny Tour, rock band T'N'T was opening act.

On 29 November 2019, Juice Wrld performed at the venue in what would become his second-last show and final headline show before his death on 8 December 2019.

On 26 and 27 January 2024, veteran punk band NOFX played their final Australian shows to a sold-out crowd at Festival Hall, 30 years after their first Australian tour.

== See also ==
- List of concert halls
