= The Beatles' 1964 world tour =

1964 concert tour by the Beatles

The Beatles 1964 world tour
- Tour by the Beatles
- Poster to the concerts in Stockholm, Sweden
- Location: Asia; Europe; Oceania
- Start date: 4 June 1964
- End date: 16 August 1964
- Legs: 2
- No. of shows: 30

The Beatles concert chronology
- 1964 UK tour; The Beatles' 1964 world tour; The Beatles' 1964 North American tour

The Beatles 1964 world tour was the first world tour of the English rock band the Beatles, launched after their 1964 UK tour. The reception was enthusiastic; The Spectator described it as "hysterical". It was followed by their North American tour in August of that year.

== Tour history ==
Negotiations for an Australasian tour started in October 1963, and their manager, Brian Epstein, signed in January 1964 (a month before the Beatles' American tour). The weekly cost increased from £1500 to £2500, plus airfares and excess baggage for drums and amps. The negotiations between Robert Kerridge of Kerridge Odeon in Auckland, Kenn Brodziak of Aztec Service's in Melbourne, their London agent Cyril Berlin of The Grade Organisation and Epstein were by telegram (many reproduced in the 2024 book).

The Beatles were stated to have made £250,000 from their Australasian tour.

=== Jimmie Nicol temporarily replaces Ringo Starr ===
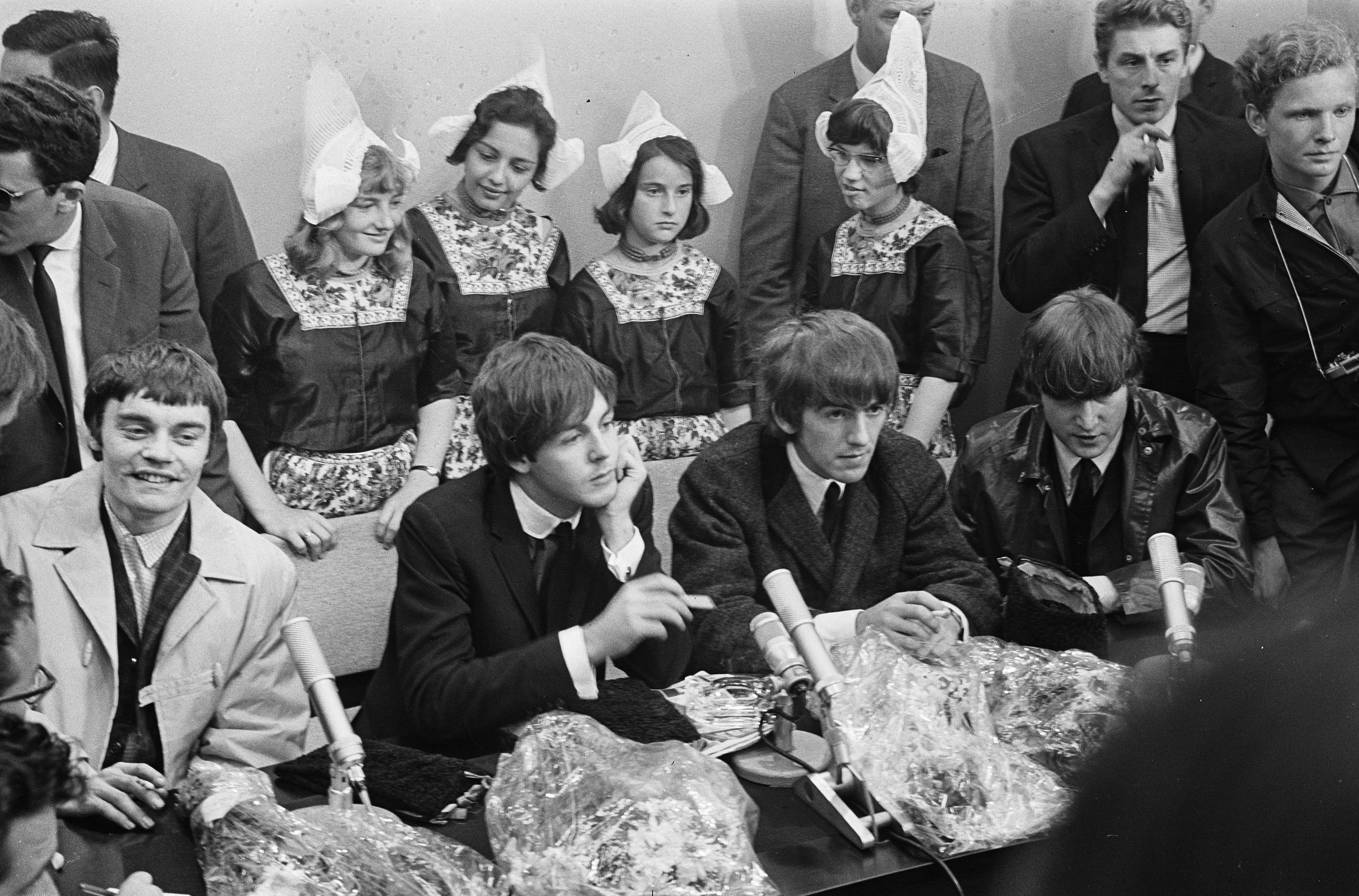
Press conference at Schiphol Airport, Jimmie Nicol on the left

On the morning of 3 June 1964, the day before the tour was to begin, Ringo Starr, the band's drummer, fell ill during a photo session. He fainted and was taken to hospital with a strong fever, where he was diagnosed with severe tonsillitis and hospitalised for a few days in London. The Beatles, especially George Harrison, wanted to postpone the tour, but Epstein and the record producer George Martin decided to temporarily replace Starr with Jimmie Nicol. When Starr heard this, he was convinced he was about to be permanently replaced.

During rehearsals, when the Beatles asked Nicol how he was doing, his answer was always "It's getting better"; this phrase later inspired Paul McCartney's song "Getting Better" from the 1967 album Sgt. Pepper's Lonely Hearts Club Band. Years later, Nicol said that he would have done the tour for free, but Epstein offered him £2,500 per performance and a £2,500 bonus. "I couldn't sleep that night, I was one of the fucking Beatles!" he said in a 1988 interview.

The tour began on 4 June 1964 in Copenhagen, Denmark; Nicol played eight shows across five cities until Starr rejoined the band in Melbourne, Australia, on 14 June. Nicol, a very shy person, did not say goodbye to the group and left at night while they were sleeping. At the airport, Epstein gave him £500 and a gold watch with the inscription "From The Beatles and Brian Epstein to Jimmie - with appreciation and gratitude". On the return journey on the plane he was very sad, feeling "like a bastard child rejected by his new family".

== Tour dates ==
Date	City	Country	Venue
Europe
4 June 1964 (Note: As Ringo Starr was hospitalized in the UK, Jimmie Nicol was temporarily hired to stand in for Ringo as a drummer for the shows from 4–13 June until Ringo rejoined the group in Melbourne.)	Copenhagen	Denmark	K.B. Hallen
5 June 1964	Hillegom	Netherlands	Treslong, TV appearance for VARA
6 June 1964	Blokker	Netherlands	Veilinghallen
Asia
9 June 1964 (Note: Two shows were staged on this day; 7.30 and 9.30 pm. Backing for the 7.30 pm show was by the Maori Hi Five and Sounds Incorporated. Tickets wrongly said 10 June and were overstamped 9 June.)	Kowloon	British Hong Kong	Princess Theatre
Oceania
12 June 1964 (Note: Two shows were staged on this day.)	Adelaide	Australia	Centennial Hall
13 June 1964	Adelaide	Australia	Centennial Hall
15 June 1964	Melbourne	Australia	Festival Hall
16 June 1964	Melbourne	Australia	Festival Hall
17 June 1964	Melbourne	Australia	Festival Hall
18 June 1964	Sydney	Australia	Sydney Stadium
19 June 1964	Sydney	Australia	Sydney Stadium
20 June 1964	Sydney	Australia	Sydney Stadium
22 June 1964	Wellington	New Zealand	Wellington Town Hall
23 June 1964	Wellington	New Zealand	Wellington Town Hall
24 June 1964	Auckland	New Zealand	Auckland Town Hall
25 June 1964	Auckland	New Zealand	Auckland Town Hall
26 June 1964	Dunedin	New Zealand	Dunedin Town Hall
27 June 1964	Christchurch	New Zealand	Majestic Theatre
29 June 1964	Brisbane	Australia	Brisbane Festival Hall
30 June 1964	Brisbane	Australia	Brisbane Festival Hall
Europe
12 July 1964	Brighton	England	Hippodrome Theatre
19 July 1964	Blackpool	England	ABC Cinema
23 July 1964	London	England	London Palladium
26 July 1964	Blackpool	England	Blackpool Opera House
28 July 1964	Stockholm	Sweden	Johanneshovs Isstadion
29 July 1964	Stockholm	Sweden	Johanneshovs Isstadion
2 August 1964	Bournemouth	England	Gaumont
9 August 1964	Scarborough	England	Futurist Theatre
16 August 1964	Blackpool	England	Blackpool Opera House

== Typical set list ==
The typical set list for the shows was as follows (with lead singers noted):

1. "I Saw Her Standing There" (Paul McCartney)
2. "I Want To Hold Your Hand" (John Lennon and Paul McCartney) or "You Can't Do That" (John Lennon)
3. "All My Loving" (Paul McCartney)
4. "She Loves You" (John Lennon, Paul McCartney and George Harrison)
5. "Till There Was You" (Paul McCartney)
6. "Roll Over Beethoven" (George Harrison)
7. "Can't Buy Me Love" (Paul McCartney)
8. "This Boy" (John Lennon, Paul McCartney and George Harrison)
9. "Twist and Shout" (John Lennon)
10. "Long Tall Sally" (Paul McCartney)

== See also ==
- The Beatles' 1964 tour of Australasia
- The Beatles' 1964 North American tour
- List of the Beatles' live performances
- Beatles '64, a 2024 documentary film

== Sources ==
- The Spectator, Volume 213, 1964
- Armstrong, Greg; Neill, Andy (2024). When We Was Fab: Inside the Beatles Australasian Tour 1964. Woodslane Press, Warriewood NSW, Australia. ISBN 978-1-922800-68-8.
- Baker, Glenn A (1982). The Beatles Down Under: the 1964 Australia & New Zealand tour. Glebe, NSW Australia: Wild & Woolley.
- Baker, Glenn A (1985). The Beatles Down Under: the 1964 Australia & New Zealand tour (2 ed.). Ann Arbour, Michigan: Pierian Press. ISBN 0-87650-186-2.
- Hutchins, Graham (2004). Eight Days a Week:the Beatles' tour of New Zealand 1964. Auckland, NZ: Exisle. ISBN 0-908988-55-9.
