= Georgie Fame and the Blue Flames =

British rhythm and blues group (1958–1966)

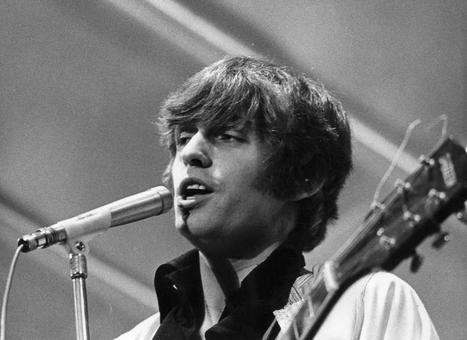
- Lead vocalist Georgie Fame in Stockholm 1968

Background information
- Also known as: The Blue Flames
- Origin: Britain
- Genres: R&B; pop; rock; jazz
- Years active: 1958–1966
- Past members: Georgie Fame; Clay Nicholls; Tony Harvey; Mike O'Neill; Al Allison; Rick Hardy; Peter Wharton; Johnny Watson; Joe Brown; Billy Fury; Kenny Packwood; Brian Gregg; Clem Cattini; Tex Makins; Colin Green; Red Reece; Earl Watson; Speedy Acquaye; Mick Eve; Joe Moretti; John McLaughlin; Johnny Marshall; Rod Slade; Eddie Thornton; Tommy Frost; Roy Mills; Peter Coe; Jimmie Nicol; Phil Seamen; Micky Waller; Bill Eyden; Glenn Hughes; Mitch Mitchell; Cliff Barton; Ricky Fenson

Georgie Fame and the Blue Flames were a British rhythm and blues group during the 1960s whose repertoire spanned R&B, pop, rock and jazz.

They were influenced by Jon Hendricks, Mose Allison and blues musicians such as Willie Mabon.

The group found other influences in ska, which could be heard in Jamaican cafes in and around Ladbroke Grove, England, and frequented by the group's Jamaican-born trumpeter Eddie Thornton. During the group's three-year residency at The Flamingo Club, Fame heard the latest jazz and blues from America. It was Booker T. & the M.G.'s recording "Green Onions" which inspired him to take up playing Hammond organ with the band.

== History ==
Vincente Tartaglia, AKA Clay Nicholls, originally led them in 1958, before he departed and the band became the backing band for rock and roll singer Billy Fury. At the end of 1961, their piano player Georgie Fame took over as lead vocalist and they went on to enjoy great success without Fury.

=== Formation ===
Georgie Fame (then known as Clive Powell) and Colin Green had worked together in 'Colin Green's Beat Boys', who had backed Gene Vincent and Eddie Cochran during UK tours. In 1961, piano player Fame, drummer Red Reece, bassist Tex Makins, and Green were hired by pop manager Larry Parnes to back Billy Fury as the Blue Flames. Fury's manager dismissed them in February 1962 as he felt they were "too jazzy" and replaced them with the Tornados.

=== 1961–1963 ===
In December 1961, Alan "Earl" Watson fronted the Blue Flames, playing tenor saxophone and singing. In May 1962, the group was augmented by Ghanaian percussionist Neeomi "Speedy" Acquaye, and Green left the group. Fame took over as the lead vocalist, Green was replaced by Joe Moretti, and in turn was later replaced by John McLaughlin. During that time, Rod "Boots" Slade had taken over as bass player while Makins toured with Johnny Hallyday. Saxophonist Mick Eve joined the group in 1962, and eventually the line-up was completed by Johnny Marshall.

McLaughlin departed in April 1963 when he joined The Graham Bond Organisation, leaving the group without a guitarist for 18 months, and during this period, Rik Gunnell took over the management of the band. In September 1963, they recorded their debut album Rhythm and Blues at the Flamingo which was produced by Ian Samwell, engineered by Glyn Johns and released on the Columbia label.

=== 1964–1966 ===
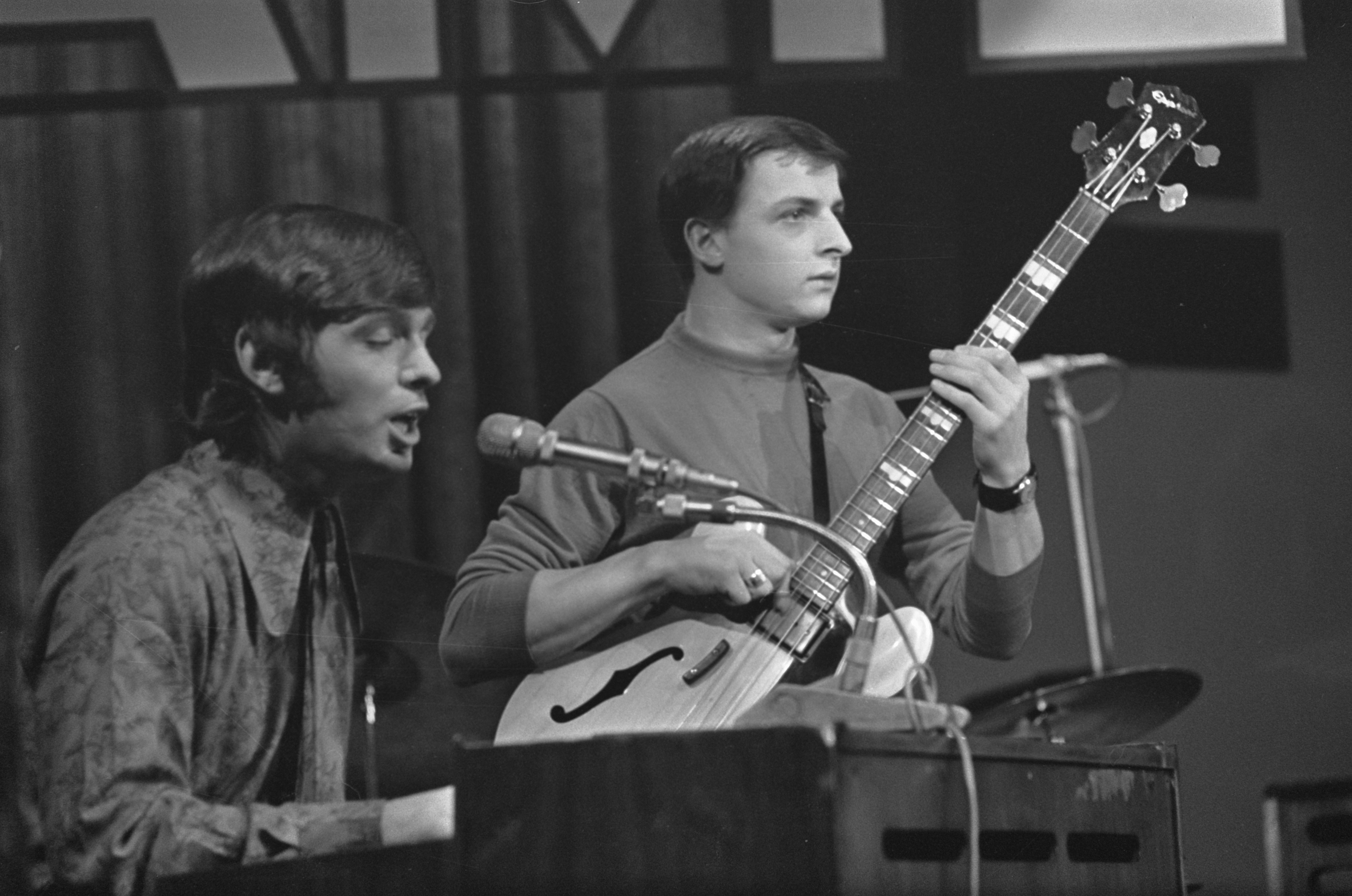
Fame with Rick Brown on bass at the Grand Gala Du Disque, Amsterdam (2 October 1966)

Rhythm and Blues at the Flamingo failed to enter the UK chart, as did the single "Do the Dog" which was taken from this album and released in 1964. Two other singles, "Do Re Mi" and "Bend a Little", were also released during 1964, achieving no commercial success.

In July 1964, Peter Coe replaced Marshall and was soon joined by baritone saxophonist Glenn Hughes and trumpet player Eddie "Tan-Tan" Thornton who had previously appeared occasionally with them and Green rejoined the group in October 1964.

Reece became ill in 1964 and was replaced by Tommy Frost. Jimmie Nicol spent a brief period as drummer, then left to replace Ringo Starr for 13 days on a Beatles tour. Phil Seamen and Micky Waller sat in for Nicol until Bill Eyden became the band's full-time drummer in September 1964.

In October 1964, the album Fame at Last reached No.15 in the U.K. album chart. The band's version of the song "Yeh, Yeh" was released as a single in the U.K. on 14 January 1965 and reached No.1 on the U.K. Singles Chart for two weeks (out of a total of twelve weeks on the chart).

The song "In the Meantime" was released as a single in February 1965 and reached the U.K. Top Twenty, however, the band's next two single releases were not chart entries. Success followed with Fame's self-penned song Get Away (released on 17 June 1966), which climbed to the top of the UK chart for a solitary week in late July. The song was originally written as a jingle for a television petrol advertisement (National filling stations). It was later used as the theme tune for a long-running travel and lifestyle show on Australian television called Getaway. The two subsequent singles, "Sunny" and "Sitting in the Park" reached chart positions of No. 13 and No. 12, respectively. After the album Sweet Thing (1966) was released, Fame signed to CBS and became a solo artist.

Eyden and Makins remained as the group's rhythm section until they were replaced in December 1965 by Cliff Barton and Mitch Mitchell. That lineup recorded the album Sweet Things, then on 1 October 1966, Fame disbanded the Blue Flames to pursue a solo career. Within a week, Mitchell had been selected over Aynsley Dunbar to be the third member of what would be called The Jimi Hendrix Experience. Less than four weeks after the disbandment, on 28 October 1966, saxophonist Glenn Hughes (born 1942) died in a fire.

=== Concert and appearances ===
The group were resident at several London clubs including The Whiskey-A-Go-Go, in Soho's Wardour Street and the Flamingo Club. In August 1963 the band took a weekly Friday night spot at The Scene on Great Windmill Street. They also performed at The Roaring Twenties club near Carnaby Street, run by Count Suckle. They did 22 midweek gigs at Klooks Kleek in 1964/65, The Ricky Tick in Windsor, and The Scene, during weekdays.

In 1964, Fame and the band appeared on five episodes of ITV's Ready Steady Go! Fame also appeared on television in 1965 in the New Musical Express Poll Winners' Concert held at the Empire Pool, Wembley on 11 April 1965, playing "Yeh, Yeh" and Rufus Thomas's "Walking the Dog".

Georgie Fame and the Blue Flames were the only act from the UK invited to perform with the first Motown Review in the UK during the mid-1960s. The Tamla Motown Package Show was a 21-date UK tour featuring, amongst others, the Supremes, Stevie Wonder and Martha Reeves & the Vandellas.

On 26 December 1966, Fame, backed by the Blue Flames, opened the "Fame in '67' Show" alongside Cat Stevens and the show ran for two weeks at London's Saville Theatre.

In later years, Fame was billed again with the Blue Flames, and in the early 2000s, he led a new line-up which included his son.

== Georgie Fame and the Aussie Blue Flames ==
Georgie Fame and the Aussie Blue Flames
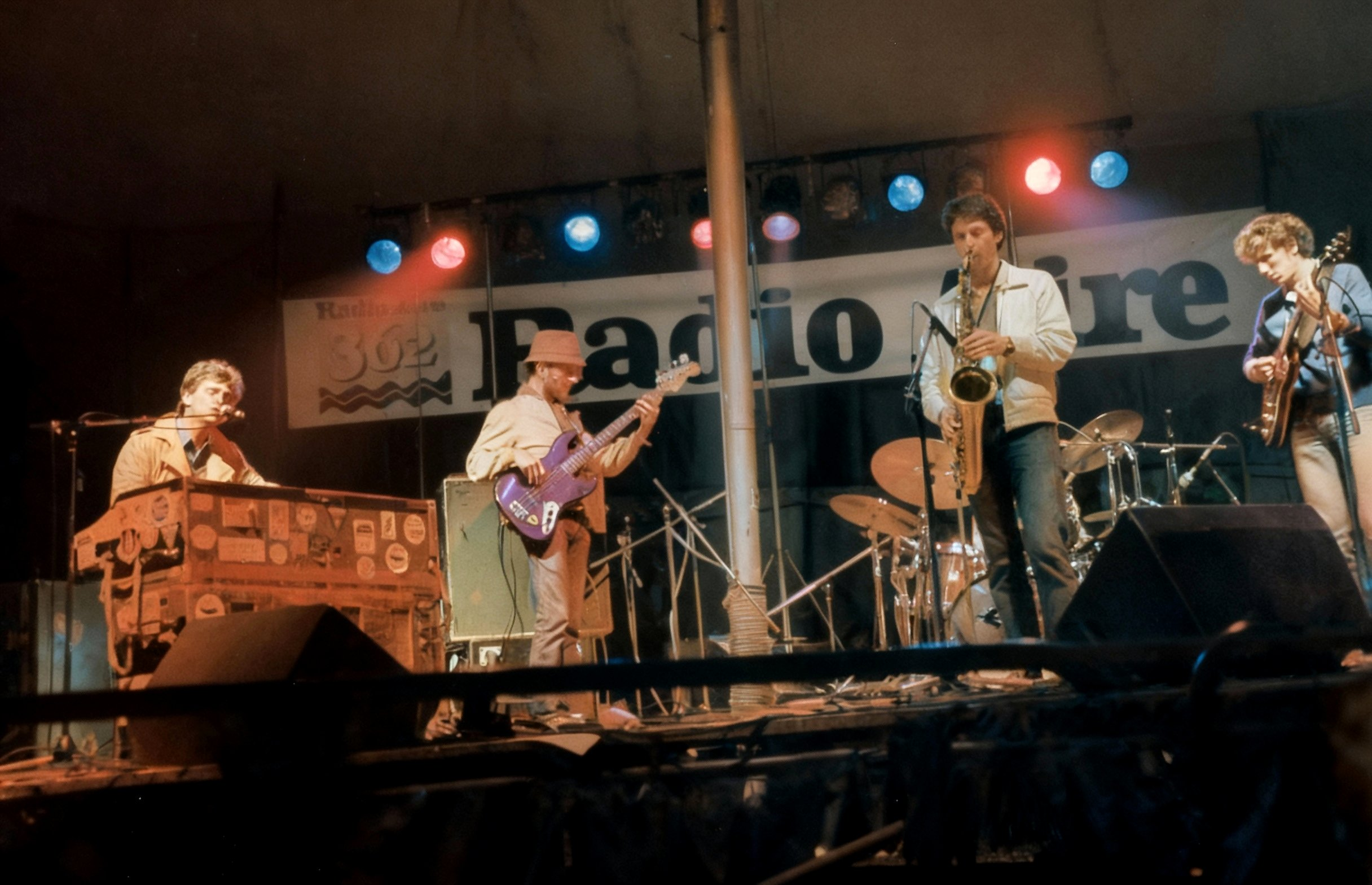
- Georgie Fame and the Blue Flames on stage at the 1983 Leeds Folk Festival

Background information
- Also known as: The Thrill Seekers
- Origin: Australia
- Genres: Jazz
- Past members: (see list)

Fame ventured to Australia annually from 1977 to 1988 to play his music and escape the English winter. Speaking to Kate Deamer of The Sydney Morning Herald, he explained that "there are several attractions to coming over, not least of which is the climate. Also, I've now got a very warm relationship with Australian musicians and look forward to coming out each year to play with them". Each year an all-Australian backing band was hired to accompany Fame on tour, who were "top Sydney Jazz musicians". For the 1980 tour, they were called the Thrill Seekers, and were led by a front line of Keith Stirling (trumpet), Col Loughnan (saxophones, flute), and Herb Cannon (trombone) with Steve Murphy (guitar), Greg Lyon (bass), and Willie Qua (drums) completing the line-up.

The next year, the band changed their name to the Aussie Blue Flames, and Charlie Gould was the guitarist. Over the years, the band featured Dave Coulton (guitar, 1983), and Bob Johnson (trombone, 1987–88). In September 1988, Fame seconded the Aussie Blue Flames to Albert Studios in Sydney to record the album No Worries, borrowing from the Australian habit of saying "No worries" often. The musician credits were:

- Georgie Fame – vocals, keyboards
- Keith Stirling – flugelhorn, trumpet
- James Greening – trombone
- Col Loughnan – saxophone, flute
- Jimmy Doyle – guitar
- Greg Lyon – bass
- Russell Dunlop – drums
- Sunil D'Silva – percussion

The album was released in 1988, under the name "Georgie Fame" with no mention of the Aussie Blue Flames, on the Swedish label Four Leaf Clover. Paul Speelman of The Age praised the touring band in 1988, saying, "One would be hard put to find many better combos in the world than this particular sextet of Aussie Blue Flames." Fame continued to tour in Australia until 2006; however, the visits were more sporadic than before 1988.

== Popular culture ==
Two of the band's recordings, "Pink Champagne" and "Yeh, Yeh", were featured in the 2020 Netflix series The Queen's Gambit.

== Personnel ==
=== Members ===
- Clay Nicholls – lead vocals (November 1958 – September 1959, June 1961)
- Tony Harvey – guitar (November 1958 – March 1959, August – September 1959)
- Mike O'Neill (1938–2013) – piano (November 1958 – March 1959)
- Al Allison – drums (November 1958 – March 1959)
- Rick Hardy (1933–2006) – rhythm guitar (June – September 1959)
- Peter Wharton – bass (June – September 1959)
- Johnny Watson – drums (June – September 1959)
- Joe Brown (born 1941) – lead guitar (June – August 1959)
- Georgie Fame (born 1943) – lead vocals, keyboards (December 1959, June 1961 – October 1966)
- Billy Fury (1940–1983) – vocals (December 1959, June – December 1961)
- Kenny Packwood – guitar (December 1959)
- Brian Gregg (1939–2024) – bass (December 1959)
- Clem Cattini – drums (December 1959)
- Tex Makins (1940–2017) – bass (June 1961 – October 1962, October 1963 – December 1965)
- Colin Green (born 1943) – guitar (June 1961 – May 1962, October 1964 – October 1966)
- Red Reece – drums (June 1961 – December 1963, January – April 1964)
- Earl Watson (born 1940) – vocals, saxophone (December 1961 – May 1962)
- Speedy Acquaye (1931–1993) – percussion (May 1962 – mid-1963, October 1963 – July 1966)
- Mick Eve (born 1937) – saxophone (May 1962 – July 1964)
- Joe Moretti (1938–2012) – guitar (May – June 1962)
- John McLaughlin (born 1942) – guitar (June 1962 – April 1963)
- Johnny Marshall (1930–2017) – saxophone (July 1962 – April 1964)
- Rod Slade (1941–2013) – bass (October 1962 – October 1963)
- Eddie Thornton (1931–2025) – trumpet (mid-1963 – April 1964, March 1965 – July 1966)
- Tommy Frost – drums (December 1963 – January 1964)
- Roy Mills – drums (December 1963 – January 1964)
- Peter Coe (1930–2009) – saxophone (April 1964 – October 1966)
- Jimmie Nicol (born 1939) – drums (April – May 1964)
- Phil Seamen (1926–1972) – drums (May – September 1964)
- Micky Waller (1941–2008) – drums (July – September 1964)
- Bill Eyden (1930–2004) – drums (September 1964 – December 1965)
- Glenn Hughes (1942–1966) – saxophone (November 1964 – October 1966)
- Mitch Mitchell (1946–2008) – drums (December 1965 – October 1966)
- Cliff Barton (1944–1968) – bass (December 1965 – July 1966)
- Ricky Fenson (born 1945) – bass (July – October 1966)

=== Deaths ===
- Glenn Hughes (born 1942) died on 28 October 1966 in Shepherd's Bush in a fire, aged 23–24, less than four weeks after the Blue Flames disbanded.
- Cliff Barton (born 1944) died 16 May 1968 from sepsis, brought on by a heroin overdose, aged 23–24.
- Phil Seamen (born 28 August 1926) died in his sleep on 13 October 1972, aged 46.
- Billy Fury (born 17 April 1940) died from a heart attack on 28 January 1983, aged 42.
- Speedy Acquaye (born 7 June 1931) died from liver cancer on 15 September 1993, aged 62.
- Bill Eyden (born 4 May 1930) died on 15 October 2004, aged 74.
- Rick Hardy (born 17 October 1933) died on 10 December 2006, aged 73, after a suspected drunk driver struck him.
- Micky Waller (born 6 September 1941) died of liver failure on 29 April 2008, aged 66.
- Mitch Mitchell (born 9 July 1946) died in his sleep on 12 November 2008, aged 62.
- Peter Coe (born 21 November 1930) died 16 March 2009, aged 68.
- Joe Moretti (born 10 May 1938) died on 9 February 2012, aged 73.
- Rod Slade (born 3 September 1941) died on 3 May 2013, aged 71.
- Mike O'Neill (born 8 July 1938) died on 10 October 2013, aged 75.
- Tex Makins (born 3 July 1940) died on 23 February 2017, aged 76.
- Johnny Marshall (born 15 September 1930) died 15 May 2017, aged 86.
- Brian Gregg (born 31 January 1939) died on 21 April 2024, aged 85.
- Eddie Thornton (born 19 October 1931) died in a hospice on 10 December 2025, aged 94.
