= Blokker, Netherlands =

Blokker
- Village
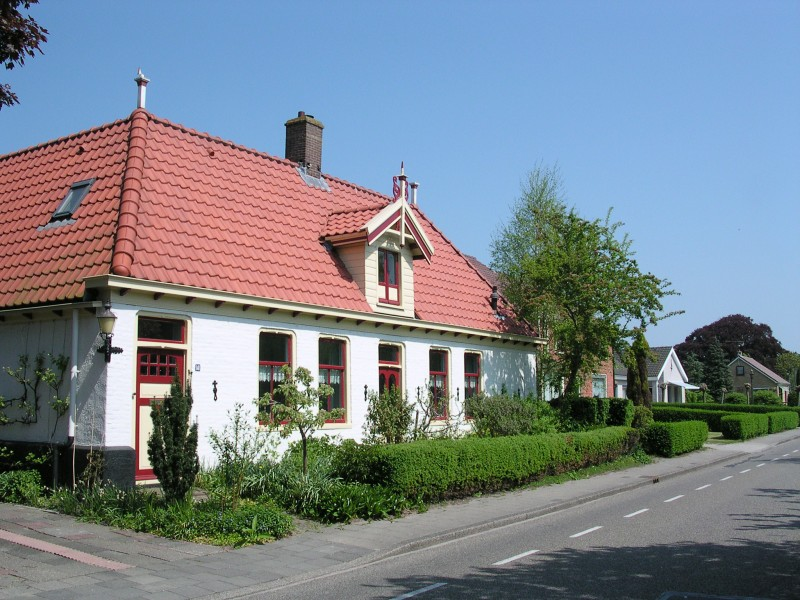

- Flag Coat of arms

- Location in the Netherlands Location in the province of North Holland in the Netherlands
- Coordinates: 52°40′N 5°06′E
- Country: Netherlands
- Province: North Holland
- Municipality: Drechterland; Hoorn

Area
  - Total: 6.44 km^{2} (2.49 sq mi)
- Elevation: −0.1 m (−0.33 ft)

Population (2021)
  - Total: 5,315
  - Density: 825/km^{2} (2,140/sq mi)
- Time zone: UTC+1 (CET)
  - Summer (DST): UTC+2 (CEST)
- Postal code: 1695 & 1696
- Dialing code: 0229

Blokker is a village in the northwest Netherlands, in the province of North Holland and the region of West Friesland.

== History and geography ==
Blokker consists of two parts: Westerblokker in the municipality of Hoorn, and Oosterblokker in Drechterland (population 1,565). Until 1979, Blokker was a separate municipality. The village was one of the locations of the only three concerts on Dutch soil by The Beatles, during their 1964 world tour. That they played in Blokker was due to Ben Essing, the son of the mayor. Essing had also managed to get other acts to play in the Blokker auction hall, and organized a "Dutch Teener Fest" in 1964 and 1965, which made international headlines.

== Transportation ==
There is a regular bus service to Hoorn railway station, which is, along with Hoorn Kersenboogerd railway station, the closest station to Blokker.

== Notable people ==
- Dirk Schouten (born 2001), Racing driver and content creator

== Gallery ==
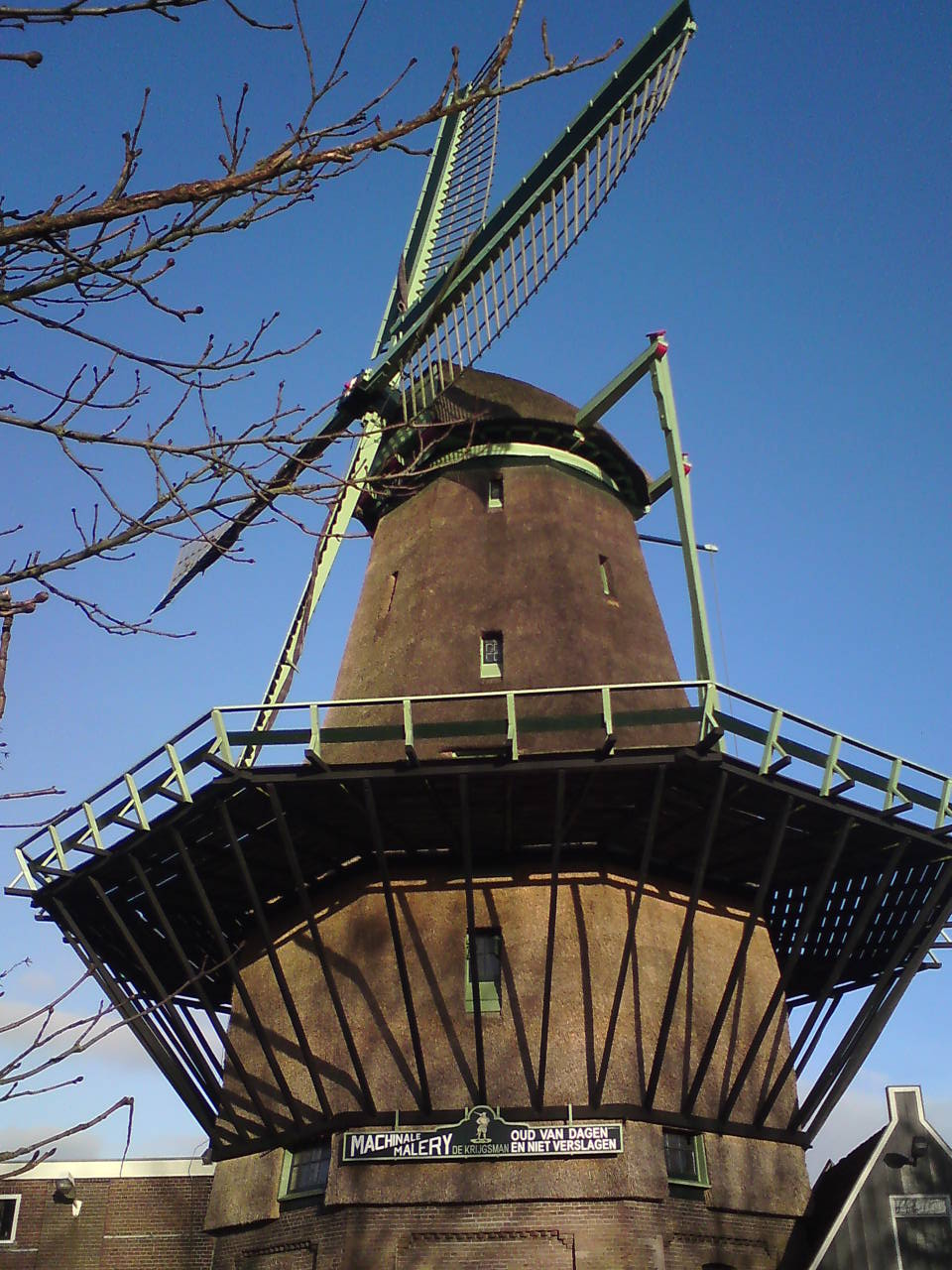
Mill: De Krijgsman in the eastern part of the village.

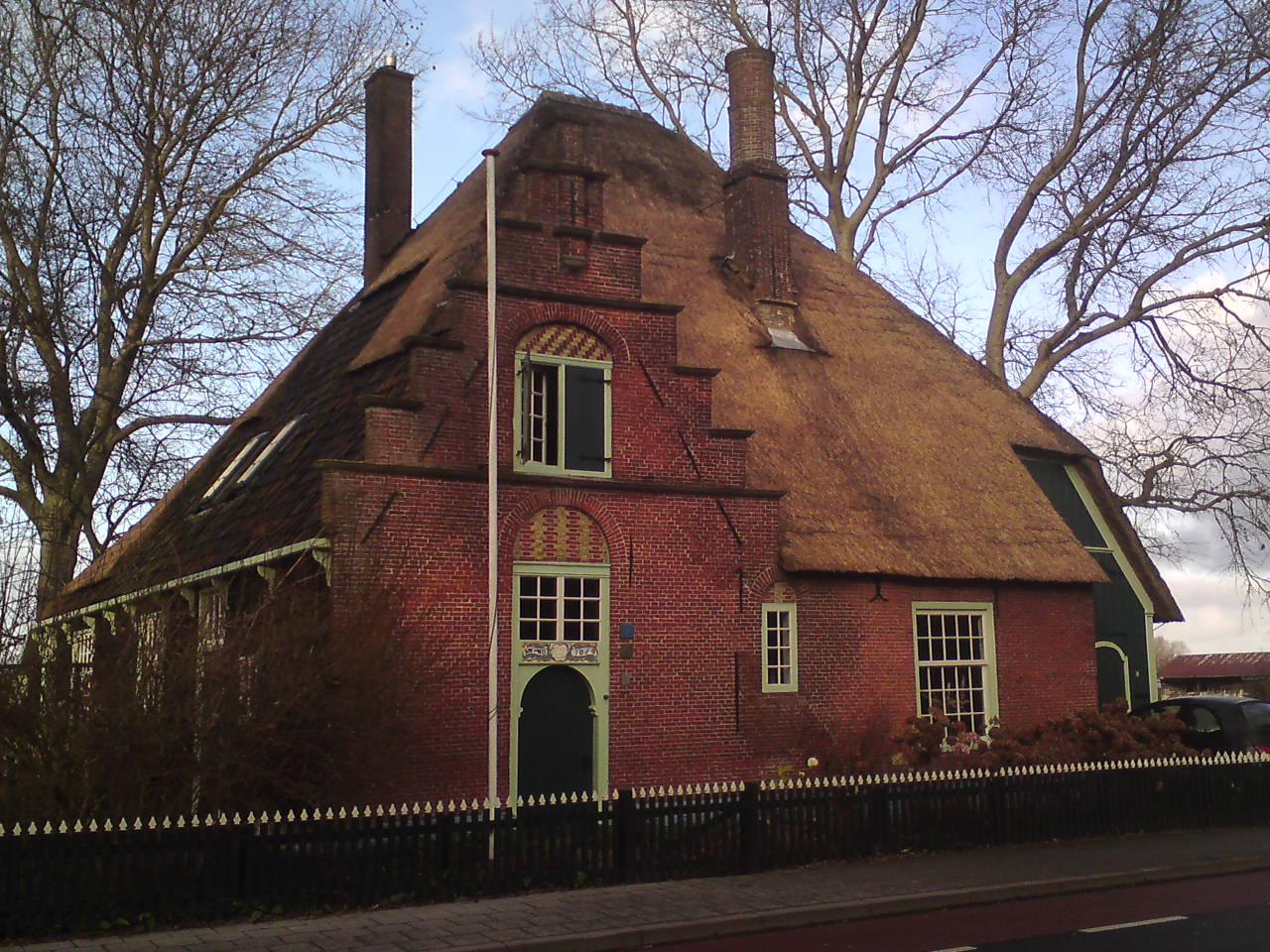
Farmhouse De Barmhartige Samaritaan in the western part of the village.

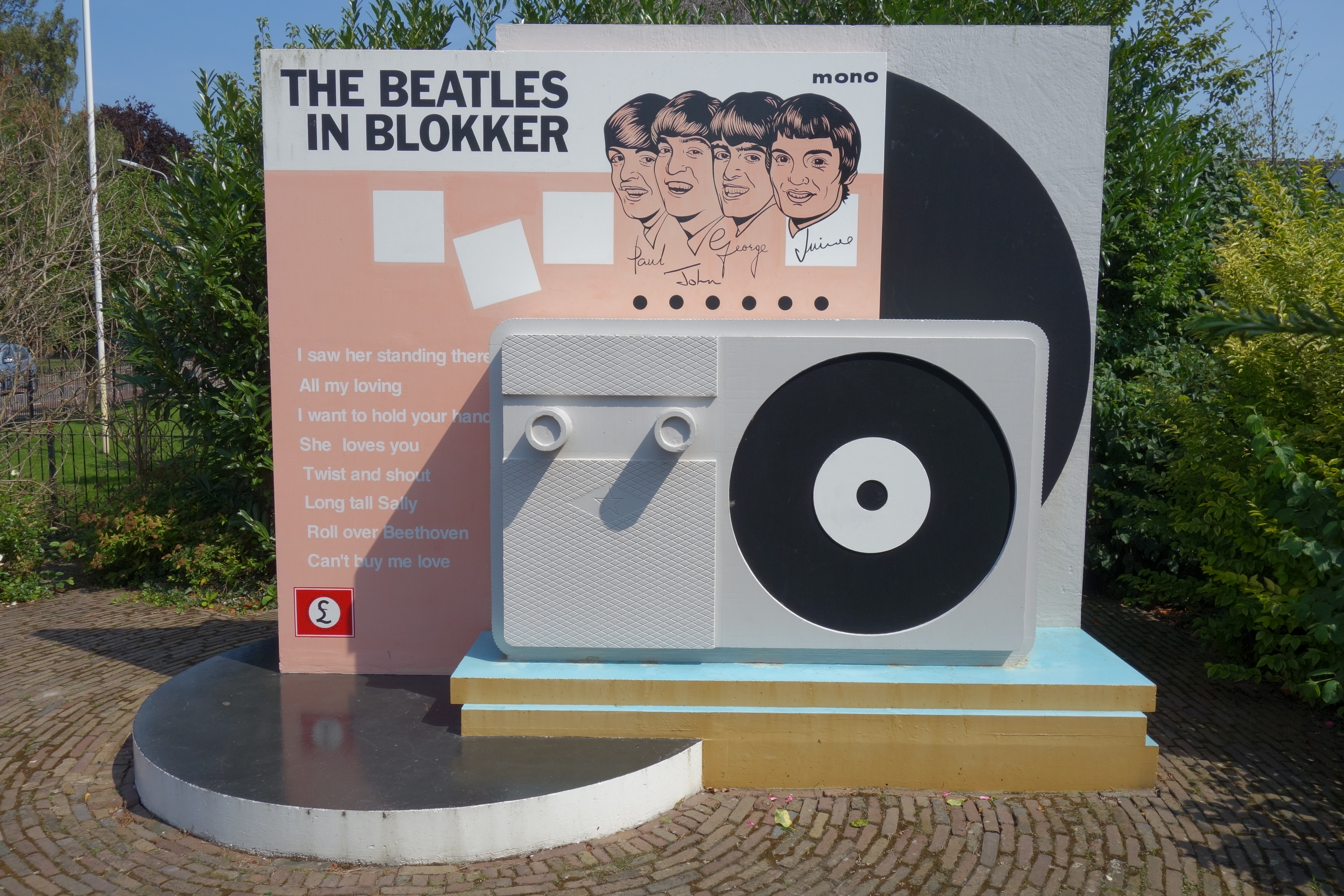
Monument for the two concerts given by The Beatles.

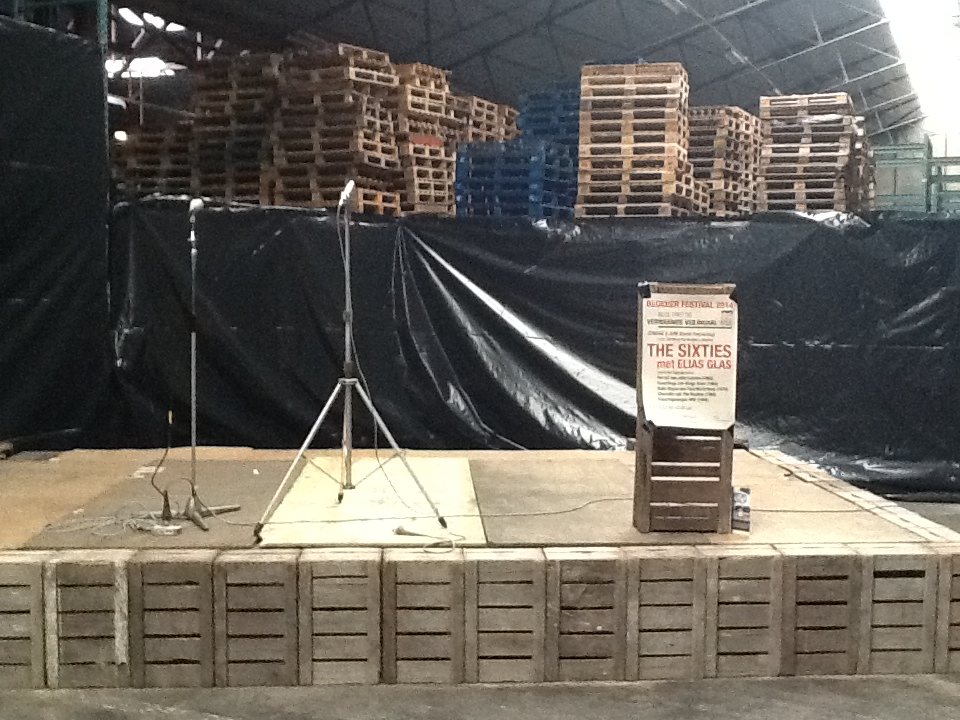
Beatles stage, made with produce crates. Rebuilt for 50th anniversary, 2014.
