= The Flamingo Club =

Former jazz nightclub in Soho, London

- The Pink Flamingo
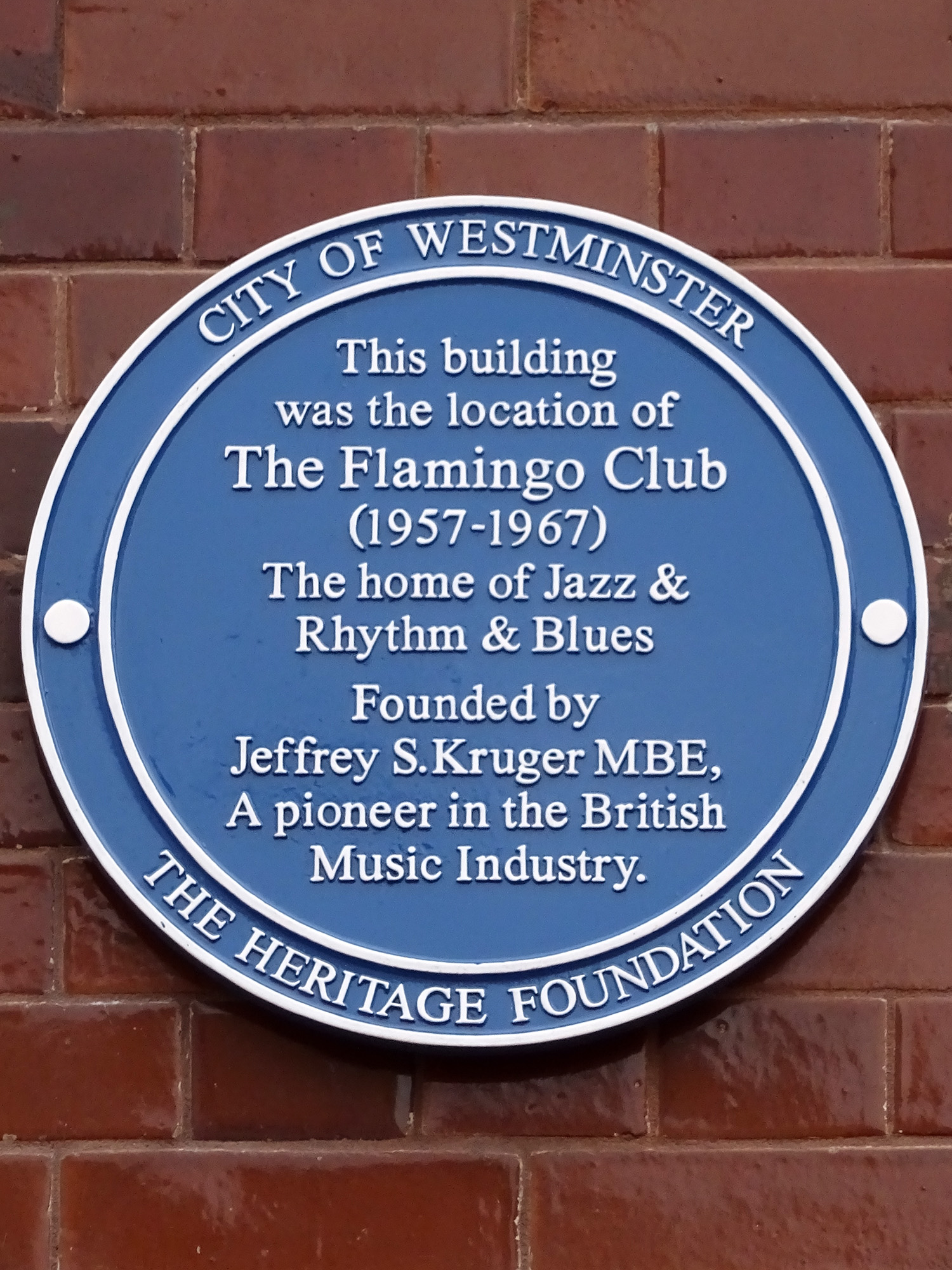
- Blue plaque erected on 1 June 2017 at 33-37 Wardour Street
- Interactive map of The Flamingo Club
- Address: Wardour Street; London, W1; England
- Coordinates: 51.5113°N 0.1322°W
- Operator: Jeffrey Kruger; Sam Kruger; Rik Gunnell; Johnny Gunnell
- Type: Nightclub
- Public transit: Leicester Square; Piccadilly Circus

Construction
- Opened: 1952
- Closed: 1967

The Flamingo Club was a jazz nightclub in Soho, London, between 1952 and 1969. It was located at 33–37 Wardour Street from 1957 onwards and played an important role in the development of British rhythm and blues and modern jazz. During the 1960s, the Flamingo was one of the first clubs to employ fully amplified stage sound and it used sound systems provided by ska musicians from the Caribbean. The club had a wide social appeal and was a favourite haunt for musicians, including the Who.

No 37 Wardour Street was previously the address of the Shim Sham Club, which opened in 1935 and was known as "London's miniature Harlem".

== The 1950s ==
The club first opened in August 1952 under the ownership of Jeffrey Kruger, a London-born jazz fan, and his father Sam Kruger. Its first premises were in the basement of the Mapleton Restaurant at 39 Coventry Street, near Leicester Square. Jeffrey Kruger's intention was to provide a centre for high-quality music in comfortable surroundings. It was promoted as Britain's most comfortable club and male visitors were expected to wear ties. The club acquired its name from the song "Flamingo", which was used as a theme tune by the resident band, Kenny Graham's Afro-Cubists. Acts were introduced by Tony Hall. The club rapidly gained a strong reputation, attracting visiting performers such as Sarah Vaughan, Ella Fitzgerald and in 1954, Billie Holiday.

In April 1957, the club moved to new premises in the basement of a former grocery store at 33–37 Wardour Street, where it initially remained primarily a jazz venue, with Ronnie Scott and Tubby Hayes as members of the resident band. The club became particularly well known for its weekend "all-nighters", staying open on Friday and Saturday nights until 6.00 am, a practice that had started on an occasional basis in 1953.

Jeffrey Kruger and his father Sam continued to own the club, but its management was taken over in 1959 by Rik Gunnell, a former boxer, market worker and bouncer, who had previously run an all-night club at the Mapleton Hotel with the hotel's manager Tony Harris. Rik and his brother Johnny launched regular all-nighters and the ethos of the club gradually changed.

== The 1960s ==
The Flamingo was sometimes described as an intimidating place in the early 1960s, where gangsters, pimps and prostitutes hung out with American servicemen, West Indians, and music fans, and fighting among customers was not unusual. John Mayall described the club as "a very dark and evil-smelling basement.... It had that seedy sort of atmosphere and there was a lot of pill-popping. You usually had to scrape a couple of people off the floor when you emerged into Soho at dawn...". In October 1962, the club was the scene of a fight between jazz fans Aloysius Gordon and Johnny Edgecombe, both lovers of Christine Keeler, which ultimately led to the public revelations of the Profumo affair.

By 1963, the Flamingo also became known as a centre of the mod subculture, where fans and musicians of both jazz and R&B music would rub shoulders. Unusually, it employed black musicians and DJs; it did not have a drinks licence, and illicit drug-taking was commonplace and generally tolerated by the police. It also became recognised as a meeting place for famous musicians, including members of the Beatles, the Rolling Stones, Jimi Hendrix and many others. An example of this is that on 6 August 1965, Brian Jones and Paul McCartney attended a performance by the Byrds, with Jane Asher. John McLaughlin said: "The Flamingo was the real meeting place, more than the 100 Club and the Marquee. Everybody came down there and we had some really good jam sessions." The first performance of the Rolling Stones' original lineup of Brian Jones, Mick Jagger, Keith Richards, Bill Wyman, Charlie Watts, and Ian Stewart took place at the venue on 14 January 1963.

Through the resulting melting pot of music, fashion and social cross-culture, the Flamingo played a small but important part in the breakdown of racial prejudice in post-war British society and the club was one of the first UK venues to introduce ska music to a white audience, with performances by Jamaican-born musicians such as Count Suckle.

== Related uses ==
In the 1930s, the club had been the site of the Shim Sham Club, an unlicensed jazz club popular with black and gay audiences, run by Ike Hatch, and its successor the Rainbow Roof.

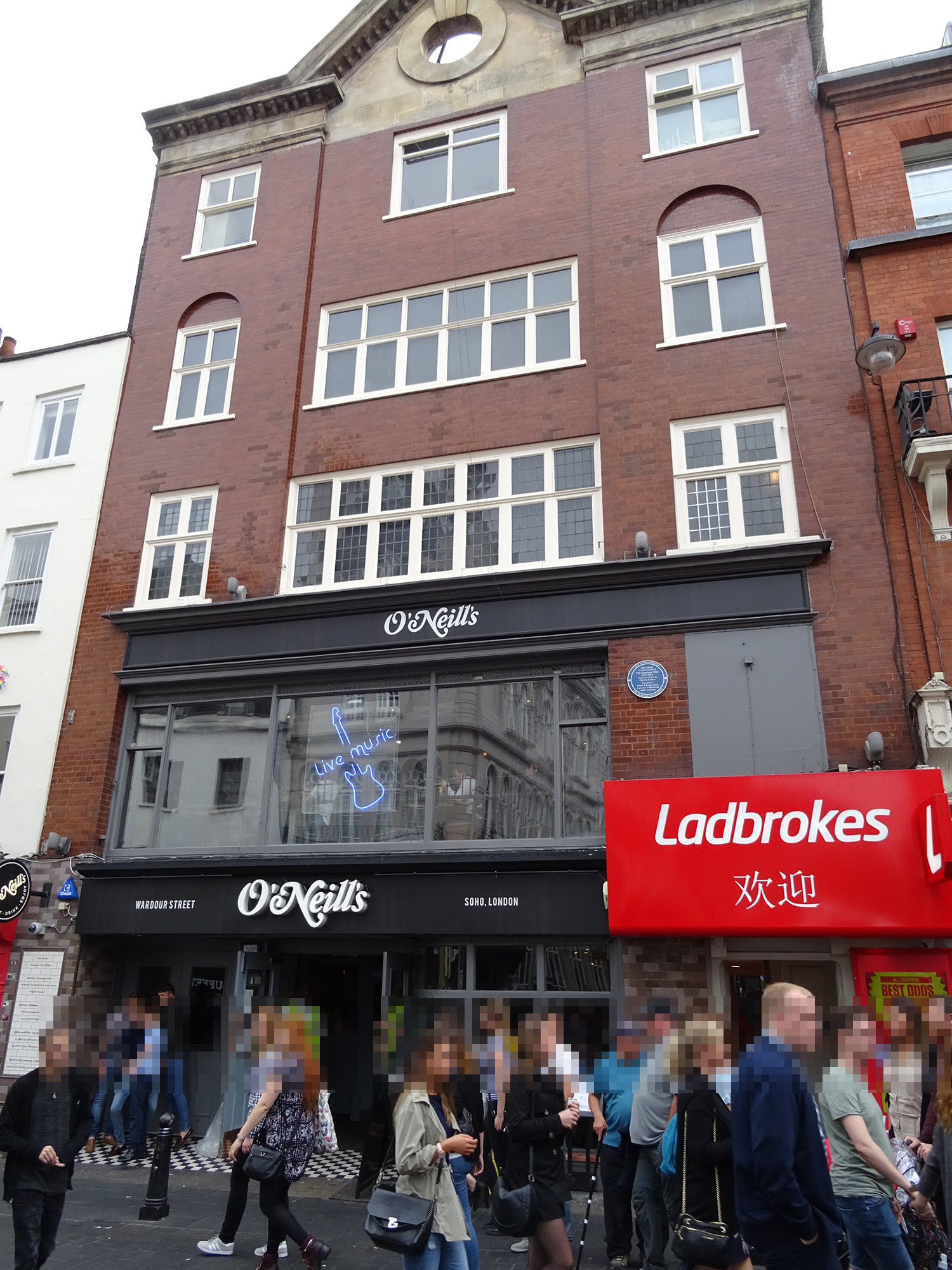
33-37 Wardour Street in 2017

The club was later renamed "The Pink Flamingo" but closed in May 1969. The venue then became "The Temple", hosting prog rock bands such as Genesis and Queen, but finally closed around 1972. Since 2001, the premises have formed part of a branch of O'Neill's Irish-themed pub chain.

The upper floors of the same building were used for the Whisky A Go Go club, renamed the WAG Club by entrepreneur Chris Sullivan in October 1982, which closed in 2001.

== Musicians and music ==
In the early days of the club, artists such as Sarah Vaughan, Ella Fitzgerald and in 1954 Billie Holiday, all performed there. Early line-ups of the house band included saxophonists Joe Harriott, Tubby Hayes, Ronnie Scott, drummer Tony Kinsey, vibraphonist Bill Le Sage and pianist Tommy Pollard.

Over the years, the club succeeded in promoting the best in jazz, rhythm and blues, as well as cross-over genres, mixing successful established acts with up-and-coming artists. Many of the emerging acts that the Flamingo promoted went on to become respected music industry names. The Flamingo became not only the venue for a "who's who" of British rock and R&B, but also visiting American artists such as Stevie Wonder, Bill Haley, Patti LaBelle, John Lee Hooker and Jerry Lee Lewis. This melting pot of music-industry talent often led to memorable jam sessions. From 1962 to 1965, the resident band was Georgie Fame and the Blue Flames, who in 1963 recorded a live album at the club, Rhythm and Blues at the Flamingo, produced by Ian Samwell.

Musicians who played at the Flamingo in the 1960s included Dizzy Gillespie, Rod Stewart, Otis Redding, Wilson Pickett, Zoot Money, the Big Roll Band, John Mayall, Eric Clapton, Ginger Baker, the Rolling Stones, the Moody Blues, the Animals, Chris Farlowe and the Thunderbirds, Mick Fleetwood, Peter Bardens, Shotgun Express, Cream (who formed as a result of meeting at the club), Atomic Rooster, Pink Floyd, Georgie Fame and the Blue Flames, Bobby Tench, the Gass, the Johnny Burch Octet, Alexis Korner, Carmen McRae, Brian Auger, Jack Bruce, Ginger Baker, Long John Baldry, Cliff Bennett and the Rebel Rousers, the then newly formed Small Faces and Steve Marriott.

== Owners and managers ==
=== Jeffrey Kruger ===
Jeffrey Kruger established Ember Records in 1960, and later the TKO Group. He became a leading music promoter and was awarded the MBE in 2002 for services to the music industry. Kruger died in Florida in May 2014, aged 83.

=== Rik and Johnny Gunnell ===
Rik and Johnny Gunnell, who took over the club in 1959, later set up a management and booking agency in Soho. Together, they managed artists such as Zoot Money, Geno Washington, Long John Baldry, Cliff Bennett, Fleetwood Mac, John Mayall, Rod Stewart, Slade, and the Gass.

In January 1966, Gunnell and his brother opened the Ramjam Club, named after Geno Washington's Ramjam Band) in Brixton High Road, London S.W 9. Otis Redding made his British debut there, and the Animals and the Who played the club as favours to the Gunnells. During 1967, Rik Gunnell managed the artist roster at The Bag O'Nails, Kingly Street, London, W1.

Later, the brothers joined the Robert Stigwood Organisation and in the late 1960s, Rik Gunnell took over Robert Stigwood's offices in New York City and Los Angeles. He also set up an après-ski venue in Kitzbühel, Austria. Rik Gunnell died in 2007.

== Discography ==
- Tony Kinsey, Jeff Kruger's Jazz at the Flamingo (1955). Decca DFE 6253
- Georgie Fame and the Blue Flames, Rhythm and Blues at the Flamingo (1964). Columbia 33SX 1599
- John Mayall, Blues Breakers with Eric Clapton: 40th anniversary Deluxe Edition [disc 2 tracks 14–19] (2006). Decca 984 180-1.
