= Jimmie Nicol =

English drummer (born 1939)

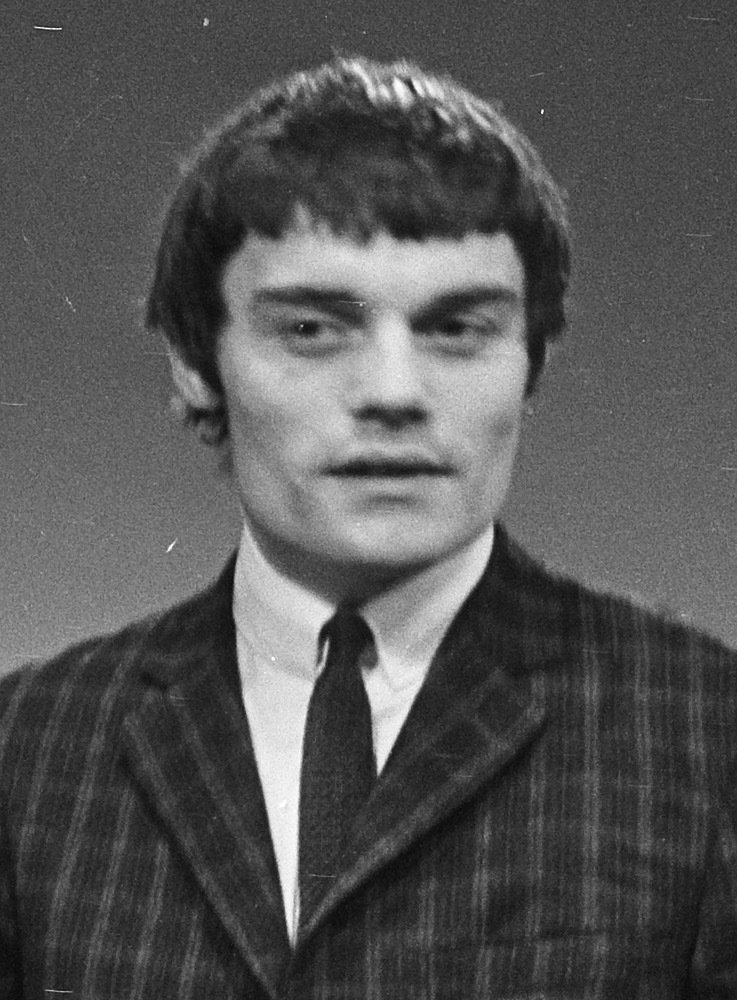
- Nicol in 1964

Background information
- Born: James George Nicol; 3 August 1939 (age 87); Barnes, London, England
- Genres: Rock; pop
- Occupations: Musician; entrepreneur
- Instruments: Drums; percussion
- Years active: 1957–1971
- Formerly of: Colin Hicks & The Cabin Boys; The Shubdubs; Georgie Fame and the Blue Flames; The Spotnicks
- Spouse: Josefina Nicol (divorced)

James George Nicol (born 3 August 1939) is an English drummer and business entrepreneur. He is best known for sitting in for Ringo Starr in the Beatles for eight concerts of the Beatles' 1964 world tour during the height of Beatlemania. (Note: He used the spelling "Jimmie Nicol" on his own bass drum.)

The concerts elevated Nicol from relative obscurity to worldwide fame, but the spotlight moved away from him once Starr returned to the group. In 1965 his subsequent lack of commercial success culminated in bankruptcy.

He worked with several bands, most successfully the Spotnicks, and several more while living in Mexico. In 1975, he left the music business to pursue a variety of entrepreneurial ventures.

Over the decades, Nicol increasingly shied away from media attention, preferring not to discuss his connection to the Beatles nor seeking financial gain from it. His son, Howie Nicol, is a BAFTA award-winning sound engineer.

== Early career ==
Jimmie Nicol's career break came in 1957 when he was spotted by Larry Parnes whilst drumming with various bands in London's The 2i's Coffee Bar. Britain's skiffle-dominated music scene was giving way to rock and roll popularised by Teddy Boy youth. Parnes invited Nicol to join Colin Hicks & The Cabin Boys whom Parnes co-managed with John Kennedy (Colin Hicks is the younger brother of English entertainer Tommy Steele, whom Parnes also managed). After taking a temporary break from the group to be a member of the original pit band in the Lionel Bart musical Fings Ain't Wot They Used T'Be at the Theatre Royal Stratford East Nicol rejoined Hicks's band for their appearance in the 1958 Italian film documentary Europa Di Notte, breaking them in Italy and subsequently allowing them to tour there extensively. During the early 1960s, Nicol went on to play for a number of artists, including Vince Eager, Oscar Rabin and Cyril Stapleton, and was kept in regular work through Charlie Katz, a well-known session fixer during that period. Nicol has cited drummer Phil Seamen and saxophonist Julian "Cannonball" Adderley as being his main influences.

In 1964, Nicol helped to form The Shubdubs with former Merseybeats bassist Bob Garner, a jazz line-up similar in musical style to Georgie Fame and the Blue Flames, a group with whom Nicol had sat-in when they were the resident house band at London's now defunct Flamingo Jazz Club. Other members of The Shubdubs were Tony Allen (vocals), Johnny Harris (trumpet), Quincy Davis (tenor saxophone), and Roger Coulam (organ – went on to form Blue Mink). It was at this point that he received a telephone call from the Beatles' producer, George Martin. Nicol recalled: "I was having a bit of a lie down after lunch when the phone rang."

== With the Beatles ==
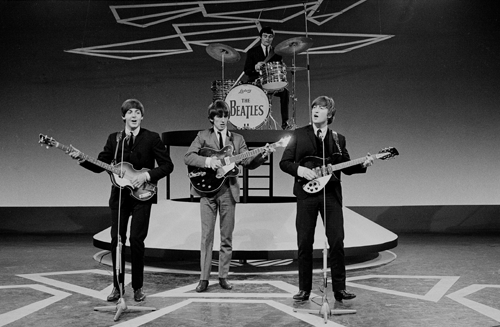
McCartney, Harrison, Lennon, and Nicol in the Netherlands on 5 June 1964

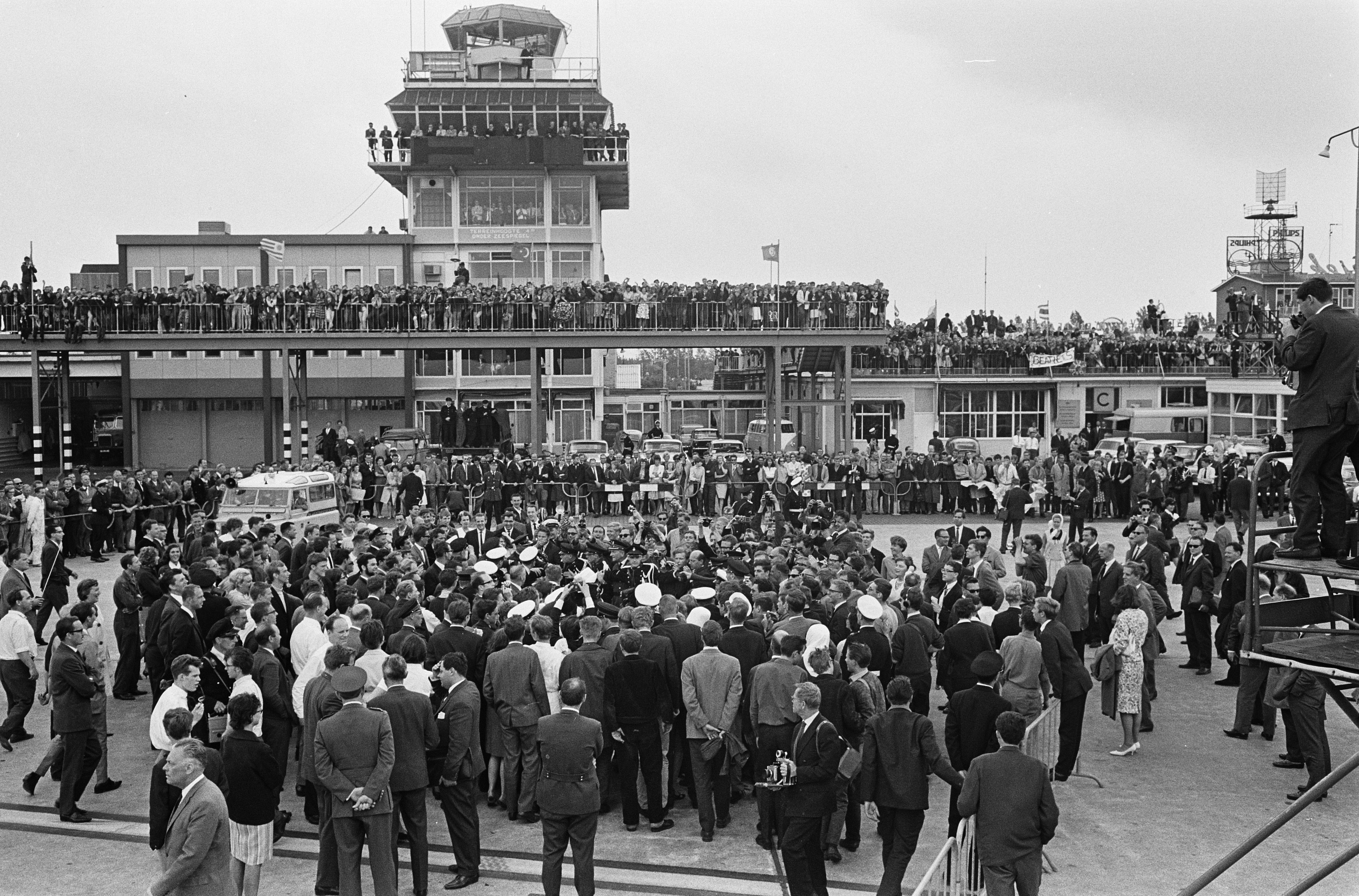
Beatlemania: Fans and media swarm the Beatles, including Nicol, at Schiphol Airport, the Netherlands, June 1964

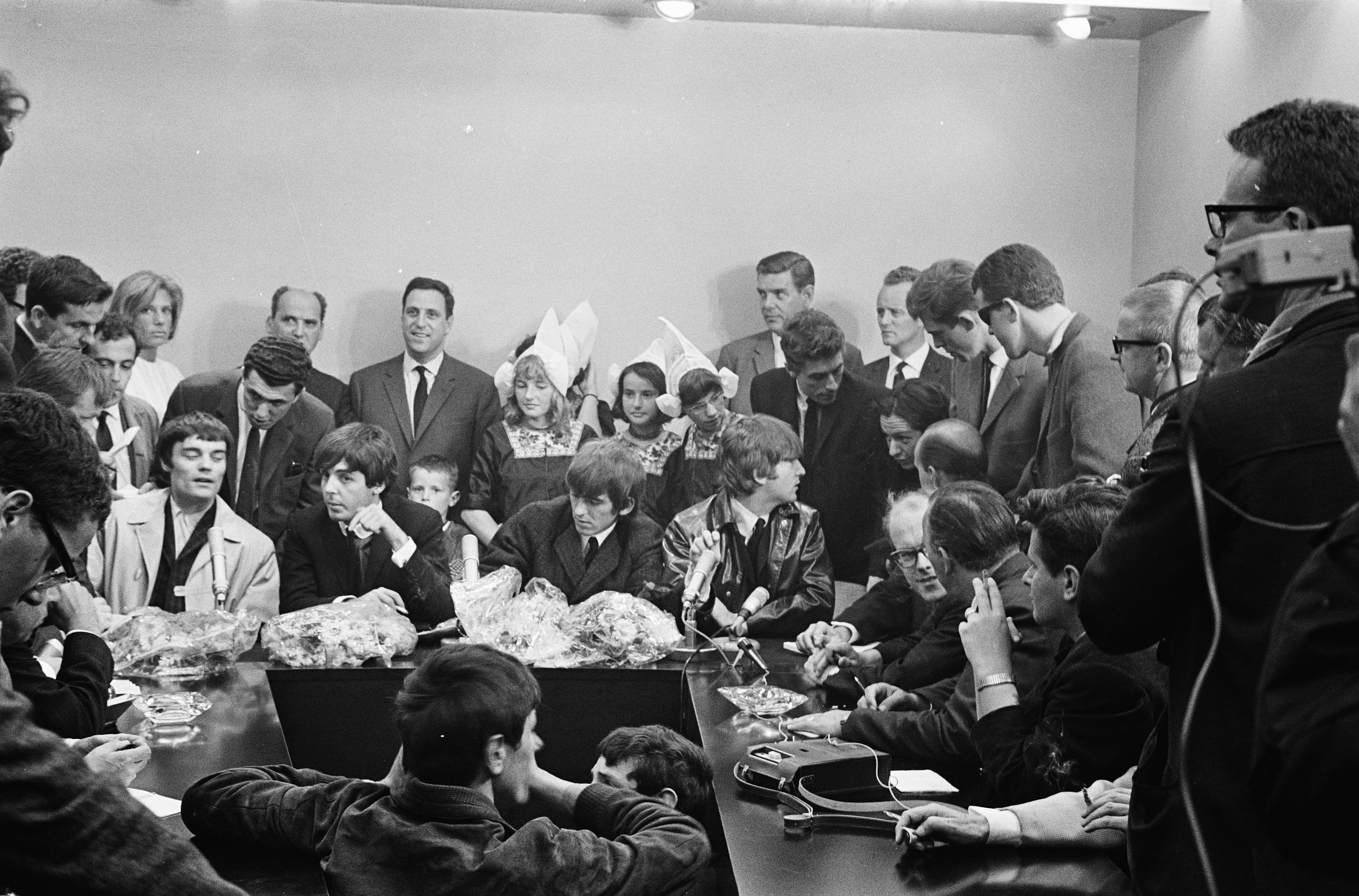
The press interviews the Beatles, including Nicol, at Schiphol Airport

When Ringo Starr became ill with tonsillitis and was hospitalised on 3 June 1964, the eve of the Beatles' 1964 Australasian tour, the band's manager Brian Epstein and their producer George Martin urgently discussed the feasibility of using a stand-in drummer rather than cancelling part of the tour. Martin suggested Jimmie Nicol as he had recently used him on a recording session with Tommy Quickly. Nicol had also drummed on a Top Six budget label album as part of an uncredited session band, as well as an extended play single (with three tracks on each side) of Beatles cover versions (marketed as 'Teenagers Choice' and titled Beatlemania) which meant that he already knew the songs and their arrangements. Producer Bill Wellings and Shubdubs trumpeter Johnny Harris (freelancing as an arranger and composer) were responsible for putting together alternative budget cover versions of songs taken from the British Hit Parade aimed at cash-strapped teenagers. Harris said: "The idea was for me to try and guess which six songs would be topping the charts about a month ahead. I would do the arrangements and then go into the studio and record 'sound a-likes'; the first EP (extended play) released got to number 30 in the charts. Jimmie was on drums and, as you can imagine, we covered a lot of the Beatles' songs."

Although John Lennon and Paul McCartney quickly accepted the idea of using a temporary substitute, George Harrison threatened to pull out of the tour telling Epstein and Martin: "If Ringo's not going, then neither am I. You can find two replacements." Martin recalled: "They nearly didn't do the Australia tour. George is a very loyal person. It took all of Brian's and my persuasion to tell George that if he didn't do it he was letting everybody down." Tony Barrow, who was the Beatles' press officer at the time, later commented: "Brian saw it as the lesser of two evils; cancel the tour and upset thousands of fans or continue and upset the Beatles."

Starr stated that "it was very strange, them going off without me. They'd taken Jimmie Nicol and I thought they didn't love me any more – all that stuff went through my head." The arrangements were made very quickly, from a telephone call to Nicol at his home in West London inviting him to attend an audition/rehearsal at Abbey Road Studios, to packing his bags, all in the same day. At a press conference a reporter mischievously asked John Lennon why Pete Best, who had been the Beatles' previous drummer for two years but dismissed by the group on the eve of stardom, was not rehired, to which Lennon replied: "He's got his own group [Pete Best & the All Stars], and it might have looked as if we were taking him back, which is not good for him."

Nicol played his first concert with the Beatles just 27 hours later, on 4 June at the KB Hallen in Copenhagen, Denmark. He was given the distinctive Beatle moptop haircut, put on Starr's suit, which had been altered to fit him and went on stage to an audience of 4,500 Beatles fans. McCartney recalled: "He was sitting up on this rostrum just eyeing up all the women. We'd start 'She Loves You': [counting in] 'one, two', nothing, 'one, two', and still nothing!" Their set was reduced from eleven songs to ten, dropping Starr's vocal spot of "I Wanna Be Your Man". McCartney teasingly sent Starr a telegram saying: "Hurry up and get well Ringo, Jimmie is wearing out all your suits." Commenting later on the fickle nature of his brief celebrity, Nicol reflected: "The day before I was a Beatle, girls weren't interested in me at all. The day after, with the suit and the Beatle cut, riding in the back of the limo with John and Paul, they were dying to get a touch of me. It was very strange and quite scary." He was also able to shed some light on how they passed the time between shows: "I thought I could drink and lay women with the best of them until I caught up with these guys."

While in the Netherlands, Nicol and Lennon allegedly spent an entire night in a brothel. Lennon said: "It was some kind of scene on the road. Satyricon! There's photographs of me grovelling about, crawling about Amsterdam on my knees, coming out of whorehouses, and people saying 'Good morning John'. The police escorted me to these places because they never wanted a big scandal. When we hit town, we hit it – we were not pissing about. We had [the women]. They were great. We didn't call them groupies, then; I've forgotten what we called them, something like 'slags'." Nicol discovered that, aside from acting as a Beatle, he could behave much as any tourist could: "I often went out alone. Hardly anybody recognised me and I was able to wander around. In Hong Kong, I went to see the thousands of people who live on little boats in the harbour. I saw the refugees in Kowloon, and I visited a nightclub. I like to see life. A Beatle could never really do that."

Nicol played a total of eight shows with the Beatles until 14 June, when Starr arrived in Melbourne and rejoined the group. Not wishing to disturb the Beatles sleep, he was unable to say goodbye to them when he left early the following morning for Melbourne Airport where Epstein presented him with a cheque for £500 (equivalent to $14,638 in 2026) and a gold Eterna-matic wrist watch inscribed: "From the Beatles and Brian Epstein to Jimmy – with appreciation and gratitude." George Martin later paid tribute to Nicol whilst recognising the problems he experienced in trying to readjust to a normal life again: "Jimmie Nicol was a very good drummer who came along and learnt Ringo's parts very well. He did the job excellently, and faded into obscurity immediately afterwards." Paul McCartney acknowledged: "It wasn't an easy thing for Jimmy to stand in for Ringo, and have all that fame thrust upon him. And the minute his tenure was over, he wasn't famous any more." Nicol himself expressed his disillusionment several years later: "Standing in for Ringo was the worst thing that ever happened to me. Until then I was quite happy earning £30 or £40 a week. After the headlines died, I began dying too." He resisted the temptation to sell his story, stating in a rare 1987 interview: "After the money ran low, I thought of cashing-in in some way or other. But the timing wasn't right. And I didn't want to step on the Beatles' toes. They had been damn good for me and to me."

== Later career and life ==
Nicol reformed the Shubdubs, renaming themselves Jimmy Nicol and the Shubdubs. They released two singles, "Husky"/"Don't Come Back" and "Humpty Dumpty"/"Night Train". Neither of those singles were a commercial success. He was later called upon to again stand in for an ailing drummer when Dave Clark of The Dave Clark Five fell ill and Nicol's band, Jimmy Nicol and the Shubdubs, filled in for The Dave Clark Five in Blackpool, Lancashire. Whilst there, Nicol was reminded of just how popular, albeit briefly, he had been as a stand-in Beatle; receiving a bundle of 5,000 fan letters passed on to him from an Australian radio disc jockey. Nicol sent a message back thanking the fans, promising that he would one day return to Australia permanently.

He was later reunited with the Beatles when his band appeared on the same bill as them and The Fourmost, on 12 July 1964 at the Hippodrome in Brighton.

In 1965, Nicol declared bankruptcy with debts of £4,066, nine months after being a temporary Beatle. After seeing news of Nicol's bankruptcy in the Daily Mirror, Paul McCartney recommended him to Peter and Gordon who hired him for a 1965 England tour.

Later that year, Nicol joined the successful Swedish group the Spotnicks, recording with them and twice touring the world. He left them in 1967, spending time in Mexico and forming Los Nicolquinn with Eddie Quinn; Los Nicolquinn released one album through RCA Records. He also scored the music for the film El Mes Más Cruel (lit. 'The Cruelest Month'). In 1975, he returned to England and became involved with housing renovations. In 1984, Nicol participated in a Beatles convention in Amsterdam, where he was interviewed. Nicol stated that he was writing an autobiography which has never appeared.

=== Disappearance ===
In 1988, rumours of Jimmie Nicol's death began circulating, where he was presumed dead at 49 years old. However, a newspaper published in 2005 said Nicol was alive and well and living in London. In the mid-1990s, Nicol's son Howie, who worked in sound and video production, became involved in the Beatles Anthology project; when Paul McCartney asked if he might contact Nicol, his son told McCartney, "No". The last confirmed sighting of Nicol was outside his rented first-floor flat in Kentish Town, north London, in the early 2010s.

== Legacy ==
During Nicol's nearly two week stint with the Beatles, both Lennon and McCartney often asked him how he was feeling and if he was coping, to which his reply would usually be "It's getting better". In early 1967, McCartney was walking his dog, Martha, with Hunter Davies, who was then writing the only authorised biography of the Beatles, when the sun broke through the overcast; McCartney remarked that the weather was "getting better" and he began to laugh, remembering Nicol. This event inspired the song "Getting Better" on Sgt. Pepper's Lonely Hearts Club Band released later that year. Lennon makes reference to Nicol on the Let It Be sessions in January 1969, saying: "Ringo said no, so us and Jimmie Nicol might go abroad."

While appearing on the radio show Fresh Air hosted by Terry Gross in April 2016, Tom Hanks noted that he was at least partly influenced by Jimmie Nicol's experience with the Beatles when he wrote the script for the 1996 feature film That Thing You Do!
