= Robin Douglas-Home =

British aristocrat, jazz pianist, and author (1932–1968)

- Born: Cecil Robin Douglas-Home; 8 May 1932; London, England
- Died: 15 October 1968 (aged 36); West Chiltington, West Sussex, England
- Occupations: Pianist; author
- Spouse: Sandra Paul (m. 1959; div. 1965)
- Children: 1
- Parent(s): The Hon. Henry Douglas-Home; Lady Margaret Spencer
- Relatives: Alec Douglas-Home (uncle); Charles Douglas-Home (brother)

Cecil Robin Douglas-Home (8 May 1932 – 15 October 1968) was a British aristocrat, jazz pianist, and author.

== Life ==
Robin Douglas-Home was the eldest son of the Honourable Henry Douglas-Home from his first marriage to Lady Margaret Spencer. His uncle was the former British Prime Minister Sir Alec Douglas-Home and his younger brother Charles Douglas-Home was the editor of The Times. He was first cousin of John Spencer, 8th Earl Spencer, father of Diana, Princess of Wales. Douglas-Home attended Ludgrove School, where he was noted for his artistic talent.

Douglas-Home was a jazz pianist and a leading society figure during the 1950s and 1960s. In the 1950s, he had a relationship with Princess Margaretha of Sweden but, according to the press, they were refused permission to marry by her mother, Princess Sibylla, notwithstanding a subsequent statement from King Gustaf VI Adolf saying, "The King has not imposed any ban on the marriage in question". However, Princess Margaretha's nanny and confidante Ingrid Björnberg states categorically in her memoirs that the breakup of the couple was not due to Princess Sibylla refusing to permit them to marry, but because Princess Margaretha did not wish to marry him.

Douglas-Home married the fashion model Sandra Paul in 1959 and they had a son in 1962, Sholto. The couple were divorced in 1965 coinciding with his romance with Princess Margaret, Countess of Snowdon. His divorce was the subject of a BBC television documentary by Alan Whicker.

Lady Cosima Vane-Tempest-Stewart (born 1961), second daughter of the 9th Marquess of Londonderry, claimed to be in fact a biological child of Douglas-Home, who was thought to have had a liaison with her mother, the Marchioness, who later married the singer Georgie Fame.

Douglas-Home was author of an authorised biography of Frank Sinatra (1962) and published four novels, including Hot for Certainties (1964) which won the Authors' Club Best First Novel Award. He also wrote a number of articles for journals and magazines such as Queen and Woman's Own.

Douglas-Home committed suicide in 1968 at his country home in West Chiltington, West Sussex, aged 36, having suffered for some years from clinical depression.

== Bibliography ==
=== Non-fiction ===
- Sinatra (Michael Joseph, 1962)

=== Fiction ===
- Hot for Certainties (Longman's Green and Co, 1964)
- When the Sweet Talking's Done (Leslie Frewin, 1968)
- The Faint Aroma of Performing Seals (Leslie Frewin, 1969)

== Ancestry ==
Ancestors of Robin Douglas-Home

16. Cospatrick Douglas-Home, 11th Earl of Home
8. Charles Douglas-Home, 12th Earl of Home
17. Hon. Lucy Elizabeth Montagu-Scott
4. Charles Douglas-Home, 13th Earl of Home
18. Cpt. Charles Conrad Grey
9. Maria Grey
19. Caroline Nesbit Macan
2. Hon. Henry Douglas-Home
20. George Lambton, 2nd Earl of Durham
10. Frederick Lambton, 4th Earl of Durham
21. Lady Beatrix Frances Hamilton
5. Lady Lillian Lambton
22. John Bulteel
11. Beatrix Bulteel
23. Euphemia Emily Parsons
1. Robin Douglas-Home
24. George Spencer, 2nd Earl Spencer
12. Frederick Spencer, 4th Earl Spencer
25. Lady Lavinia Bingham
6. Charles Spencer, 6th Earl Spencer
26. Col. Sir Horace Seymour
13. Adelaide Seymour
27. Elizabeth Malet Palk
3. Lady Margaret Spencer
28. Henry Baring
14. Edward Baring, 1st Baron Revelstoke
29. Cecilia Anne Windham
7. Hon. Margaret Baring
30. John Crocker Bulteel
15. Louisa Bulteel
31. Lady Elizabeth Grey
