= General Ponsonby =

General Ponsonby may refer to:

- Frederick Ponsonby (British Army officer) (1783–1837), British Army major general
- Henry Ponsonby (1825–1895), British Army major general
- John Ponsonby (British Army officer) (1866–1952), British Army major general
- William Ponsonby (British Army officer) (1772–1815), British Army major general
