= Alistair Vane-Tempest-Stewart, 9th Marquess of Londonderry =

British nobleman

The Most Honourable The Marquess of Londonderry
- Born: 7 September 1937
- Died: 20 June 2012 (aged 74)
- Spouses: Nicolette Harrison (m. 1958; div. 1971) Doreen Wells (m. 1972; div. 1989)
- Father: Robin Vane-Tempest-Stewart, 8th Marquess of Londonderry
- Mother: Romaine Combe

Alexander Charles Robert "Alastair" Vane-Tempest-Stewart, 9th Marquess of Londonderry (7 September 1937 – 20 June 2012) was a British nobleman.

== Biography ==
The son of Robin Vane-Tempest-Stewart, 8th Marquess of Londonderry (1902–1955) and his wife, the former Romaine Combe (1904–1951), Alexander Charles Robert Vane-Tempest-Stewart was known as "Alastair". He was educated at Ludgrove School. When the 8th Marquess died in 1955, Alastair became the 9th Marquess at age 18. He renovated the family estate, Wynyard Park, County Durham, which Nikolaus Pevsner described as "the most splendid 19th-century mansion house in the county". Wynyard was sold by Lord Londonderry in 1987 and is now owned by the property developer Sir John Hall.

Lord Londonderry was an accomplished pianist, and a self-taught linguist. He was an authority on Franz Liszt, the Hungarian composer and virtuoso, and could read French, German, and Italian.

His first wife, whom he married in 1958, was Nicolette Elaine Katherine, daughter of Michael Harrison, a stockbroker, and his Latvian-born wife. Nicolette, Lady Londonderry, gave birth to two daughters: Lady Sophia (b. 23 February 1959) and Lady Cosima (b. 25 December 1961, who married Lord John Robert Somerset, third son of David Somerset, 11th Duke of Beaufort).

Nicolette also gave birth to a son, Tristan, who was once but is no longer styled Viscount Castlereagh, as Lord Londonderry later proved that Tristan was not his biological child, but that of the singer Georgie Fame. The Londonderrys divorced in 1971. Lady Cosima would later claim that her biological father was actually Robin Douglas-Home, nephew of Alec Douglas-Home, the former Prime Minister. Nicolette married Georgie Fame in 1972; they later had another son, James. She died of suicide in 1993.

Lord Londonderry's second wife was Doreen Patricia Wells, former principal dancer at the Royal Ballet, whom he married in 1972; they divorced in 1989. They had two sons, Frederick Aubrey Vane-Tempest-Stewart, 10th Marquess of Londonderry (born 6 September 1972), and Lord Reginald Alexander Vane-Tempest-Stewart (b. 1977), who is married to Chloë Belinda Guinness (born 29 April 1976); the couple have a son and two daughters.

== Death ==
The 9th Marquess of Londonderry died on 20 June 2012, aged 74. His elder son, Frederick Vane-Tempest-Stewart, Viscount Castlereagh, succeeded to his titles as the 10th Marquess.

== Ancestry ==
Ancestors of Alistair Vane-Tempest-Stewart, 9th Marquess of Londonderry

16. George Vane-Tempest, 5th Marquess of Londonderry
8. Charles Vane-Tempest-Stewart, 6th Marquess of Londonderry
17. Mary Edwards
4. Charles Vane-Tempest-Stewart, 7th Marquess of Londonderry
18. Charles Chetwynd-Talbot, 19th Earl of Shrewsbury
9. Lady Theresa Chetwynd-Talbot
19. Anna Cockerell
2. Robin Vane-Tempest-Stewart, 8th Marquess of Londonderry
20. Henry Chaplin
10. Henry Chaplin, 1st Viscount Chaplin
21. Carolina Ellice
5. The Hon. Edith Chaplin
22. George Sutherland-Leveson-Gower, 3rd Duke of Sutherland
11. Lady Florence Sutherland-Leveson-Gower
23. Anne Hay-Mackenzie, 1st Countess of Cromartie
1. Alistair Vane-Tempest-Stewart, 9th Marquess of Londonderry
24. Charles Combe
12. Richard Combe
25. Henrietta Church
6. Boyce Combe
26. John Hollway
13. Esther Hollway
?
3. Romaine Combe
28. John Tombs
14. Sir Henry Tombs
29. Mary Remington
7. Mabel Tombs
30. Sir James Stirling
15. Georgina Stirling
31. Ellen Mangles

Marquess of Londonderry family tree

Alexander Stewart; 1699–1781
Baron Londonderry (2nd creation), 1789; Viscount Castlereagh, 1795; Earl of Londonderry (3rd creation), 1796; Marquess of Londonderry, 1816
Sarah Frances Seymour; 1747–1770	Robert Stewart; 1739–1821; 1st Marquess of Londonderry, Earl of Londonderry, Viscount Castlereagh, and Baron Londonderry	Frances Pratt c. 1751–1833
Baron Stewart, 1814; Earl Vane and Viscount Seaham, 1823
Robert Stewart; 1769–1822; 2nd Marquess of Londonderry, Earl of Londonderry, Viscount Castlereagh, and Baron Londonderry	Catherine Bligh d. 1812	Charles William Vane (né Stewart); 1778–1854; 3rd Marquess of Londonderry, Earl of Londonderry, Viscount Castlereagh, and Baron Londonderry; 1st Earl Vane, Viscount Seaham, and Baron Stewart	Frances Anne Vane; 1800–1865
Frederick William Robert Stewart; 1805–1872; 4th Marquess of Londonderry, Earl of Londonderry, Viscount Castlereagh, and Baron Londonderry; 2nd Baron Stewart	George Henry Robert Charles William Vane-Tempest; 1821–1884; 5th Marquess of Londonderry, Earl of Londonderry, Viscount Castlereagh, and Baron Londonderry; 2nd Earl Vane and Viscount Seaham; 3rd Baron Stewart
Charles Stewart Vane-Tempest-Stewart; 1852–1915; 6th Marquess of Londonderry, Earl of Londonderry, Viscount Castlereagh, and Baron Londonderry; 3rd Earl Vane and Viscount Seaham; 4th Baron Stewart
Charles Stewart Henry Vane-Tempest-Stewart; 1878–1949; 7th Marquess of Londonderry, Earl of Londonderry, Viscount Castlereagh, and Baron Londonderry; 4th Earl Vane and Viscount Seaham; 5th Baron Stewart
Edward Charles Stewart Robert "Robin" Vane-Tempest-Stewart; 1902–1955; 8th Marquess of Londonderry, Earl of Londonderry, Viscount Castlereagh, and Baron Londonderry; 5th Earl Vane and Viscount Seaham; 6th Baron Stewart
Alexander Charles Robert "Alastair" Vane-Tempest-Stewart; 1937–2012; 9th Marquess of Londonderry, Earl of Londonderry, Viscount Castlereagh, and Baron Londonderry; 6th Earl Vane and Viscount Seaham; 7th Baron Stewart
Frederick Vane-Tempest-Stewart b. 1972; 10th Marquess of Londonderry, Earl of Londonderry, Viscount Castlereagh, and Baron Londonderry; 7th Earl Vane and Viscount Seaham; 8th Baron Stewart	Reginald Alexander Vane-Tempest-Stewart b. 1977
Heir presumptive to all titles

Peerage of Ireland
Preceded by Robin Vane-Tempest-Stewart	Marquess of Londonderry; 1955–2012	Succeeded by Frederick Vane-Tempest-Stewart
