= Lady Margaret Douglas-Home =

English musician and writer

- Born: Hon. Alexandra Margaret Elizabeth Spencer; 4 July 1906; London, England
- Died: 26 May 1996 (aged 89); Wells-next-the-Sea, Norfolk, England
- Education: Royal College of Music
- Occupations: Musician, writer, arts promoter
- Spouse: Hon. Henry Montagu Douglas-Home (m. 1931; div. 1947)
- Children: Robin Douglas-Home; Charles Douglas-Home
- Parent(s): Charles Spencer, 6th Earl Spencer; Hon. Margaret Baring
- Relatives: Luke Douglas-Home (grandson); Diana, Princess of Wales (grandniece)
- Family: Spencer

Lady Alexandra Margaret Elizabeth Douglas-Home (née Spencer; 4 July 1906 – 26 May 1996) was an English musician, writer, and arts promoter. She founded the Burnham Market Festival and served as its director for almost two decades.

== Early years ==
Born into the aristocratic Spencer family in London in 1906, Lady Margaret was the sixth and youngest child of Charles Spencer, 6th Earl Spencer, and Margaret Baring (1868–1906), daughter of the first Lord Revelstoke, a banker. Her mother died during Margaret's birth. Her godmother was Queen Alexandra. Her youth was spent at Althorp and at Spencer House.

Douglas-Home was mainly educated at home under a governess, but spent some time at Northampton Secondary School for Girls, attending events such as concerts at the Albert Hall. She shared the musical interests of her mother and grandmother, who were both violinists, and became herself an accomplished pianist. After her father's death in 1922, she went to Paris to study French and music. She then accompanied Princess Alice, Countess of Athlone to South Africa as a lady-in-waiting, before resuming her music studies in Vienna. She also studied at the Royal College of Music in London, where she later became a trustee.

== Career ==
Douglas-Home worked in the publications department of the National Gallery in 1941 and as a lady-in-waiting to Princess Alexandra in the 1950s.

In the post-war years, she ran the Home and Van Thal publishing firm, together with Herbert van Thal and Gwylim Fielden Hughes, until was taken over by Arthur Barker about 1952.

She also bought and ran an antiques business in Burnham Market, Norfolk. This led her in 1974 to found Burnham Market Festival, which began as a series of concerts, poetry readings and drama productions. She continued as its director until 1992.

Her autobiography, A Spencer Childhood, appeared in 1994.

== Personal life ==
On 7 July 1931, she married Henry Montagu Douglas-Home (21 November 1907 – 19 July 1980), second son of the Charles Douglas-Home, 13th Earl of Home and the brother of Alec Douglas-Home, who served as Prime Minister of the United Kingdom in 1963–1964. The marriage was dissolved in 1947. They had two sons, Robin and Charles, and a daughter. Douglas-Home was the grandaunt of Diana, Princess of Wales, and a close friend of Queen Elizabeth The Queen Mother. She died at Wells-next-the-Sea, Norfolk, on 26 May 1996.

== Ancestry ==
Ancestors of Lady Margaret Douglas-Home

16. John Spencer, 1st Earl Spencer
8. George Spencer, 2nd Earl Spencer
17. Georgiana Poyntz
4. Frederick Spencer, 4th Earl Spencer
18. Charles Bingham, 1st Earl of Lucan
9. Lady Lavinia Bingham
19. Margaret Smith
2. Charles Spencer, 6th Earl Spencer
20. Lord Hugh Seymour
10. Col. Sir Horace Beauchamp Seymour
21. Lady Anne Horatia Waldegrave
5. Adelaide Seymour
22. Sir Lawrence Palk, 2nd Baronet of Haldon House
11. Elizabeth Malet Palk
23. Lady Dorothy Elizabeth Vaughan
1. Margaret Douglas-Home
24. Sir Francis Baring, 1st Baronet
12. Henry Baring
25. Harriet Herring
6. Edward Baring, 1st Baron Revelstoke
26. William Lukin
13. Cecilia Anne Windham
27. Anne Thellusson
3. Hon. Margaret Baring
28. John Bulteel
14. John Crocker Bulteel
29. Elizabeth Perring
7. Louisa Bulteel
30. Charles Grey, 2nd Earl Grey, Prime Minister of Great Britain
15. Lady Elizabeth Grey
31. Hon. Mary Elizabeth Ponsonby
