= Charles Douglas-Home (journalist) =

Scottish journalist

- Born: 1 September 1937; London, England
- Died: 29 October 1985 (aged 48)
- Spouse: Jessica Gwynne
- Children: 2, including Luke
- Mother: Lady Margaret Spencer
- Relatives: Alec Douglas-Home (uncle); Robin Douglas-Home (brother)
- Military career
- Branch: British Army
- Unit: Royal Scots Greys

Charles Cospatrick Douglas-Home (1 September 1937 – 29 October 1985) was a Scottish journalist who served as editor of The Times from 1982 until his death.

== Biography ==
Douglas-Home was the younger son of the Honourable Henry Douglas-Home from his first marriage to Lady Margaret Spencer. His uncle was the former British Prime Minister Sir Alec Douglas-Home. He was a first cousin of John Spencer, 8th Earl Spencer, father of Diana, Princess of Wales.

Born in London, he was educated at Eton College (where he was a King's Scholar) and then went into the British Army in 1956 in the Royal Scots Greys. On leaving the Army he spent nine months in Canada, supporting himself by selling books and encyclopaedias. He then served as aide-de-camp to Sir Evelyn Baring who was Governor of Kenya, at the height of the Mau Mau insurgency. During that year (1958–9) Douglas-Home found his taste for international politics. He later wrote the biography Evelyn Baring: the Last Proconsul (1978).

When he returned to the UK he wanted to work in television but was quickly rejected because his accent and approach appeared wrong and he had no journalistic training. This led him to go into newspapers and he worked on the Scottish Daily Express covering breaking news. Douglas-Home found the work dull and was about to resign when the paper's proprietor, Beaverbrook Newspapers, promoted him to be the deputy to Chapman Pincher, the respected Defence correspondent of the Daily Express in London. This job was fascinating to Douglas-Home, and confirmed him in his career. Through his family connections, Douglas-Home built a network of contacts through parliament and Whitehall.

After eighteen months, Douglas-Home became the principal political and diplomatic correspondent of the Express. However he disagreed with the paper's opposition to British entry to the European Communities and with relief in 1965 was appointed to succeed Alun Gwynne-Jones as The Times defence correspondent. He covered the Six Days War and the Soviet invasion of Czechoslovakia. From 1970 he was features editor, and in 1973 he became home editor.

William Rees-Mogg was impressed with Douglas-Home's approach and made him foreign editor in 1978. He was a candidate for the editorship when Rupert Murdoch took over the paper in 1981, but Harold Evans was appointed instead with Douglas-Home as his deputy. However a year later Murdoch and Evans had a spectacular falling-out over editorial independence, and Douglas-Home succeeded the latter as editor. He would edit The Times from 1982 to his death in 1985.

Douglas-Home stabilised the paper, which he had inherited in a parlous state in the wake of its year long closure as well as the shock of the Harold Evans dismissal., and then began a steady process of improvement. Under his leadership The Times doubled its circulation to 500,000. Although firmly conservative in the editorial line of the paper's leaders, Douglas-Home was at the same time committed to the tradition of impartial news reporting. He continued to edit the paper with great courage through his long and painful illness.

He died of cancer at age 48, leaving a widow Jessica Violet Gwynne and two sons Tara (born 1969) and Luke Douglas-Home (born 1971). He was succeeded as editor by Charles Wilson.

== Memorial Trust Award ==
The Charles Douglas-Home Memorial Trust Award was established in his honour and "in recognition of his life-long commitment to the cause of free opinion, freely expressed." In 2010, the annual competition invited submissions in areas of his "particular interest ... (namely Defence, Foreign Affairs, Democracy, The Royal Prerogative in the 21st Century, Music)".

Recipients of the Award include:

- 2025 - The Kyiv Independent
- 2024 - Ross Clark
- 2023 - The Kyiv Independent
- 2020 - Jamie Blackett
- 2017 - Harry Mount
- 2013 - Julia Pettengill for “What has gone wrong with human rights since 1948?”
- 2009 - Douglas Murray
- before 2009 - (included) VS Naipaul, Michael Gove, Matthew d’Ancona, Anne Applebaum and Anthony Daniels, James Delingpole, Philip Johnston
- 2005 - James Delingpole for "What are museums for?"
- 1992 - Anne Applebaum

As of 2025, in official records, the Memorial Trust's principal activity is identified as "to nominate a candidate for the annual award and to raise funds for the trust."

== Ancestry ==
Ancestors of Charles Douglas-Home (journalist)

16. Cospatrick Douglas-Home, 11th Earl of Home
8. Charles Douglas-Home, 12th Earl of Home
17. Hon. Lucy Elizabeth Montagu-Scott
4. Charles Douglas-Home, 13th Earl of Home
18. Cpt. Charles Conrad Grey
9. Maria Grey
19. Caroline Nesbit Macan
2. Hon. Henry Douglas-Home
20. George Lambton, 2nd Earl of Durham
10. Frederick Lambton, 4th Earl of Durham
21. Lady Beatrix Frances Hamilton
5. Lady Lillian Lambton
22. John Bulteel
11. Beatrix Bulteel
23. Euphemia Emily Parsons
1. Charles Douglas-Home
24. George Spencer, 2nd Earl Spencer
12. Frederick Spencer, 4th Earl Spencer
25. Lady Lavinia Bingham
6. Charles Spencer, 6th Earl Spencer
26. Col. Sir Horace Seymour
13. Adelaide Seymour
27. Elizabeth Malet Palk
3. Lady Margaret Spencer
28. Henry Baring
14. Edward Baring, 1st Baron Revelstoke
29. Cecilia Anne Windham
7. Hon. Margaret Baring
30. John Crocker Bulteel
15. Louisa Bulteel
31. Lady Elizabeth Grey

Media offices
Preceded by Louis Heren	Deputy Editor of The Times; 1981–1982	Succeeded by Charles Wilson
Preceded by Harold Evans	Editor of The Times; 1982-1985	Succeeded by Charles Wilson
