= Nicolette Powell =

English socialite

Nicolette Elaine Katherine Powell, formerly Nicolette Vane-Tempest-Stewart, Marchioness of Londonderry (née Nicolette Harrison; 3 November 1940 – 13 August 1993), was an English socialite, married firstly to the 9th Marquess of Londonderry and later to the musician Georgie Fame.

== Early life ==
Nicolette, often called "Nico" for short, was the daughter of stockbroker Michael Harrison and his wife, the former Maria Madeleine Benita von Koskull, a Baltic German baroness. She was a debutante, one of the last to be presented to Queen Elizabeth II before the royal patronage of the practice was abolished.

== Marriage and family ==
She married Londonderry on 16 May 1958, when she was seventeen. They made their home at Wynyard Hall and had two children:

- Lady Sophia Frances Anne Vane-Tempest-Stewart (born 1959), who married Jonathan Mark Pilkington and has children.
- Lady Cosima Maria-Gabriella Vane-Tempest-Stewart (born 1961), who married firstly Cosmo Fry and secondly Lord John Robert Somerset, with whom she has children.

The paternity of her elder son, Tristan Alexander (born 1969), who briefly held the courtesy title Viscount Castlereagh, was contested when he was about 18 months old, and he was confirmed to be the son of Georgie Fame (real name Clive Powell), with whom the young Marchioness had been having an extramarital affair. One of the Marchioness's daughters, Lady Cosima, later claimed that her true father might be the musician and writer Robin Douglas-Home.

The divorce of Lord and Lady Londonderry in 1971 was the subject of considerable publicity. The following year on 25 February 1972, the Marchioness married Georgie Fame at Marylebone Register Office, and her married name became Nicolette Powell. Londonderry subsequently married the ballerina Doreen Wells.

As Nicolette Powell, the former Marchioness gave birth to a second son of Georgie Fame, James Michael, in 1973.

== Later life ==
In 1993, she died after falling 250 feet (76 m) from the Clifton Suspension Bridge in Bristol. The subsequent inquest declared her death a suicide. She had left items with members of the public: her car keys and a note stating that she saw "no purpose in life" now that her children had grown up and left home.

Several portrait photographs of her are held by the National Portrait Gallery, London.
