= Frederick Ponsonby (British Army officer) =

British Army officer

Major-General The Honourable Sir Frederick Ponsonby GCMG KCB KCH
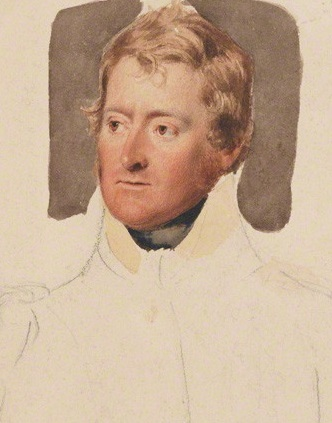
- Major-General Sir Frederick Ponsonby by Thomas Heaphy
- Born: 6 July 1783; Marylebone, London, England
- Died: 11 January 1837 (aged 53); Basingstoke, Hampshire, England
- Military career
- Allegiance: United Kingdom
- Branch: British Army
- Rank: Major-general
- Conflicts: Napoleonic Wars; Peninsular War
- Awards: Knight Grand Cross of the Order of St Michael and St George; Knight Commander of the Order of the Bath

Major-General Sir Frederick Cavendish Ponsonby (6 July 1783 – 11 January 1837) was a British Army officer. He served in numerous engagements in the Napoleonic Wars and is most famous for having miraculously survived a series of major wounds during the Battle of Waterloo in 1815.

== Early life and education ==
Frederick Cavendish Ponsonby was the second of three sons of Frederick Ponsonby, Viscount Dungannon (who succeeded as the 3rd Earl of Bessborough in 1793), and his wife Henrietta (née Spencer), Countess of Bessborough. He was the brother of John Ponsonby, 4th Earl of Bessborough, and William Ponsonby, 1st Baron de Mauley, and his sister was the "notorious" Lady Caroline Lamb, who married the Prime Minister Viscount Melbourne.

He was educated at Harrow.

== Early career ==
Ponsonby joined the army as a cornet in January 1800, serving in the 10th Light Dragoons. He was promoted lieutenant in June 1800 and Captain on 20 August 1803. He exchanged to the 60th Regiment of Foot in April 1806 and served on the staff of the Duke of Bedford, then Lord Lieutenant of Ireland, and briefly for his successor, the Duke of Richmond. Promoted major on 25 June 1807, he went into the 23rd Light Dragoons on 6 August 1809 and went with them to serve in the Peninsular War.

He fought well at Talavera. He was promoted lieutenant colonel on 15 March 1810, and served as assistant adjutant-general at Buçaco and Barrosa, directing a successful charge by a squadron of the 2nd Regiment of Hussars (KGL) against the French dragoons. He was given command of the 12th Light Dragoons on 11 June 1811.

After the fall of Badajoz, he distinguished himself in the battle of Villagarcia (or Llerena) on 11 April 1812, temporarily commanding Anson's brigade. Ordered by Sir Stapleton Cotton to detain a superior force of French cavalry under Charles Lallemand, he successfully delayed them until reinforcements could arrive to flank the French and pursue them into Llerena.

He led the 12th Light Dragoons to disperse some of the broken French infantry after the Battle of Salamanca, and was wounded while covering the withdrawal from Burgos. At Vitoria, his regiment was part of the force, under Sir Thomas Graham, that blocked the French retreat towards Bayonne. He took part in the Battle of the Pyrenees and the fighting that followed in the south of France. In Paris at the time of the abdication of Napoleon as Emperor of the French, he rode through the night to bring the news to Wellington, who famously, at an inn after defeating the French at the Battle of Toulouse, snapped his fingers and turned on his heel "in a triumphal pastiche of a flamenco dance."

== Waterloo campaign ==
During the Waterloo campaign, the 12th Light Dragoons were attached to Sir John Ormsby Vandeleur's light cavalry brigade. At the Battle of Waterloo, the 12th and 16th Light Dragoons were told to charge down the slope, but no further, to support the withdrawal of the Union Brigade of heavy cavalry. But, like the Union Brigade (led by his second cousin, William Ponsonby), the light horse charged (as he later admitted) too far.

Ponsonby was wounded in both arms, and knocked off his horse by another sabre cut. A French lancer saw him move where he lay and stabbed him in the back with his lance, exclaiming "Tu n'es pas mort, coquin" (You're not dead, you rascal). A French skirmisher then robbed him but luckily for Ponsonby, a Major de Laussat of the French Imperial Guard Dragoons found him and treated him kindly, giving him some brandy and promising to send help should the French prove victorious. Later, another French skirmisher used Ponsonby as a shield as he talked with him and fired over his body. Toward the end of the battle, he was ridden over by Prussian cavalry. During the night after the battle, he was roughed up by a Prussian looking for plunder, and a mortally wounded soldier of the Royal Dragoons had crawled upon Ponsonby's legs and lay dying. At last, Ponsonby was discovered by a soldier of the 40th Foot, who stood guard over him for hours until a cart became available to transport him back to Brussels. Despite the quixotic nursing ideas of his sister, the notorious Lady Caroline Lamb, and despite being further bled of 120 imperial fluid ounces (3.4 L) over two days, he managed to survive against the odds from his seven major wounds.

== Later career ==
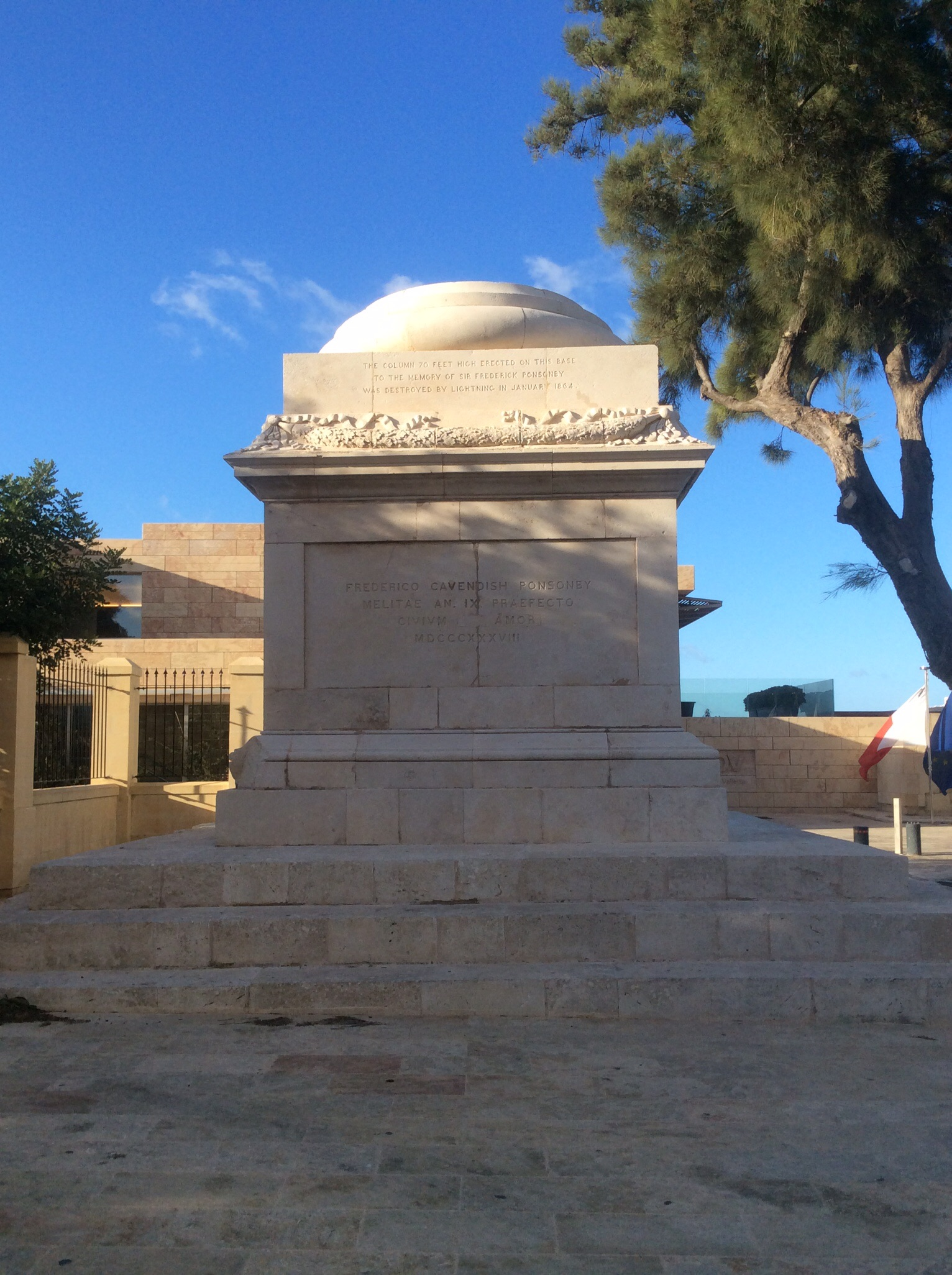
Plinth of Ponsonby's Column, a monumental column erected in Valletta in 1838. The column was destroyed by lightning in 1864, and only the plinth survives today.

Ponsonby went on half-pay on 26 August 1820, and was appointed "inspecting field officer" in the Ionian Islands on 20 January 1824. On 27 May 1825, he was promoted major-general, commanding the troops in the Ionian Islands. The next year, on 22 December 1826, he was appointed Governor of Malta, and remained there for eight and a half years. He met Baron de Laussat, his saviour at Waterloo, in 1827. During his Maltese tenure, he was made GCMG in 1828, and KCB and KCH in 1831. He left the governorship in May 1835 (but remained the de jure Governor until 30 September 1836), and was appointed colonel of the 86th Regiment of Foot on 4 December 1835. He was transferred to the colonelcy of the Royal Dragoons on 31 March 1836. During this period, he maintained a high degree of interest in the handling of cavalry, and corresponded with Wellington. He died suddenly at an inn, The Wellesley Arms at Murrell Green near Basingstoke, on 11 January 1837 and was buried in the crypt of St Nicholas' Church, Hatherop, Gloucestershire.

In 1838, Ponsonby's Column was erected in Valletta in honour of the governor. It was destroyed by lightning in 1864.

== Family ==
On 16 March 1825, Ponsonby married Lady Emily Charlotte Bathurst (died 1877), the youngest daughter of Henry Bathurst, 3rd Earl Bathurst. They had three sons and three daughters:

- Sir Henry Frederick Ponsonby (1825–1895), married Mary Elizabeth Bulteel on 30 April 1861
  - Alberta Victoria Ponsonby (6 May 1862 – 15 October 1945), married Major-General William Montgomery of Grey Abbey, son of Hugh Montgomery and Lady Charlotte Herbert
  - Magdalen Ponsonby (24 June 1864 – 1 July 1934)
  - John Ponsonby (25 March 1866 – 26 March 1952), married Mary Robley, daughter of Thomas Robley
  - Frederick Edward Grey Ponsonby (16 September 1867 – 20 October 1935), married Victoria Kennard, daughter of Edmund Hegan Kennard and Agnes Hegan, and had issue
  - Arthur Augustus William Harry Ponsonby (16 February 1871 – 24 March 1946), married Dorothea Parry, daughter of Sir Hubert Parry, 1st Baronet, and Lady Elizabeth Herbert, and had issue
- Lieutenant Colonel Arthur Edward Valette Ponsonby (3 December 1827 – 16 June 1868), married Catina Dahl
- Georgina Melita Maria Ponsonby (16 February 1829 – 18 February 1895), unmarried
- Harriet Julia Frances Ponsonby (27 October 1830 – 30 June 1906)
- Selina Barbara Wilhelmina Ponsonby (20 January 1835 – 22 July 1919), married William Windham Baring on 2 January 1862, without issue
- Frederick John Ponsonby (21 March 1837 – 3 February 1894), took holy orders and died unmarried

== Notes ==
- This article incorporates text from a publication now in the public domain: "Ponsonby, Frederic Cavendish". Dictionary of National Biography. London: Smith, Elder & Co. 1885–1900.

Parliament of the United Kingdom
Preceded by Hon. James Butler; Hon. George Ponsonby	Member of Parliament for County Kilkenny; 1806–1826; With: Hon. James Butler 1801–1820; Charles Clarke 1820–1830	Succeeded by Viscount Duncannon; Charles Clarke
Preceded by Viscount Normanby	Member of Parliament for Higham Ferrers; 1826–1830	Succeeded by Viscount Howick
Military offices
Preceded by The Marquess of Hastings	Governor of Malta; 1827–1836	Succeeded by Sir Henry Bouverie
Preceded by The Lord Harris	Colonel of the 86th (Royal County Down) Regiment of Foot; 1835–1836	Succeeded by Sir James Watson
Preceded by Lord Edward Somerset	Colonel of the 1st (Royal) Regiment of Dragoons; 1836–1837	Succeeded by Sir Hussey Vivian, Bt
