= Get Away (Georgie Fame song) =

- Danish picture sleeve

Single by Georgie Fame and the Blue Flames
- B-side: "El Bandido"
- Released: 17 June 1966
- Genre: R&B; pop
- Length: 2:24
- Label: Columbia (UK); Imperial (US)
- Songwriter: Clive Powell
- Producer: Denny Cordell

Georgie Fame and the Blue Flames singles chronology
"Something" (1965)	"Get Away" (1966)	"Sunny" (1966)

"Get Away" (Note: Some original pressings and reissues, as well as BMI, give its title as a single word, "Getaway".) is a song by Georgie Fame and the Blue Flames, written by Georgie Fame (credited under his birth name Clive Powell). Initially written and recorded for an advertising campaign for petrol, the song was subsequently released on Columbia. It topped the UK Singles Chart for one week in July 1966.

== Background ==
Fame wrote and recorded "Get Away" after being commissioned to write "a happy piece of music" as a jingle for an advertising campaign for National Benzole petrol. The song was pressed as a promotional one-sided single to be given away "to people who bought four gallons of petrol", according to Fame.

The recording was reworked after producer Denny Cordell recognised its potential. The song prominently features stabs of brass, described by music journalist Penny Valentine as "coming in at exactly the right time with the persistance of a French taxi driver blowing his horn". Baritone sax player Glen Hughes reportedly considered his one note contribution "his easiest buck in a recording studio". Fame was pleased with the song's musical balance, telling Disc and Music Echo "I'm still young enough to enjoy rock 'n' roll. I don't want to go out on a limb and play introvert jazz – the jazz I play is very danceable. "Get Away" grooves just as much as some pure rhythm and blues".

== Release and reception ==
"Get Away", backed with Fame's own composition "El Bandido", was released through Columbia on 17 June 1966 in the UK. It topped the UK Singles Chart for one week in July 1966, becoming Fame's second UK number one after "Yeh, Yeh" (1965). The single was released in the United States on the Imperial label, a subsidiary of Liberty, and reached number 70 on the Billboard Hot 100. Fame felt the chart success of "Get Away" "marked a really specific stage in my development" as, unlike "Yeh, Yeh", the song was self-composed.

Upon release, Norman Jopling and Peter Jones of Record Mirror praised the song's arrangement as "hustle-rhythm, fast-lyricked and with curious and compelling little brass-sax phrase". Penny Valentine of Disc and Music Echo considered "Get Away" "musically the best record Georgie has ever made", opining "it swings more than anything he's done on a single". Tony Barrow, writing under his pseudonym Disker in the Liverpool Echo, praised the song's "ear-catching" arrangement.

"Get Away" was later used as the theme-tune for the long-running travel and lifestyle show Getaway on Australian television.

Chart (1966)	Peak position
Canada (RPM)	1
Ireland (IRMA)	6
New Zealand (Listener)	10
UK Singles (The Official Charts Company)	1
US Billboard Hot 100	70
