= Louis Heren =

Louis Philip Heren (6 February 1919 – 26 January 1995) was a foreign correspondent. He spent his entire career on The Times and was an author of political theory, memoirs and autobiography.

== Early life ==
Heren was born in the East End of London. His father, a printer on The Times, died when Heren was four years old. As it was a paternalistic company in those days, Heren was able to leave school at 14 to begin work as a messenger on the newspaper. He moved up to work in various departments before the onset of the Second World War. He joined the British Army as a private soldier in 1939. After being commissioned, he served in France, the Western Desert, Burma and the Netherlands East Indies (NEI) raising to the rank of major. According to his son, Patrick, he served as an agent of Force 136 during the Battle of Surabaya. He initially believed that he and other British troops had arrived in Surabaya to restore order and return the city to normalcry, but after learning that Brigadier AWS Mallaby had been murdered by Indonesian militants, he "took no chances."

== Career ==
=== Foreign correspondent ===
In 1946 Heren returned to The Times and was made a foreign correspondent. He made his mark covering Indian independence in 1947, creating a furore in Britain and India with graphic eyewitness accounts of communal massacres in the Punjab. He also heard rumours of another plot to assassinate Gandhi, so he joined his weaving workshop in order to get a scoop (he was unsuccessful as the assassination happened elsewhere).

Heren was later posted to Israel where he posted the first news reports about the Dead Sea Scrolls. He also served in Beirut, Jordan, Korea, Vietnam, Egypt, Singapore, India, and Germany.

One of Heren's earliest jobs was in Vietnam during the early days of American intervention in the late 1950s. He is widely accepted as amongst the inspiration for the Thomas Fowler character in The Quiet American by Graham Greene. The author was a guest of Heren and his wife Patricia on their houseboat in Singapore.

=== Washington ===
In 1961, he became chief Washington correspondent (later American editor) of The Times. He developed a profound understanding of and sympathy for the United States over a decade of intense political and social upheaval. By-lined in The Times from 1965, he became an influential and popular commentator on American affairs in Britain. He was the first to alert the world that President John F. Kennedy had sent US combat troops to Vietnam. He accompanied Rev Martin Luther King Jr. on several of his Freedom Rides. His friendship with President Lyndon Johnson gave him a unique insight into the developing tragedy of US involvement in Vietnam. He was close to Johnson, sometimes staying up late, drinking whisky in the Oval Office, and he was a guest at the president's Texas ranch. Exceptionally, in 1968, he flew back to Washington from California where he had been covering the presidential primary. That night Patricia was awoken by Heren shouting and thrashing about, in the throes of a nightmare. Shaken awake, he described his vivid dream in which he fought back a hostile mob with his portable typewriter, desperately trying to protect presidential candidate Robert F. Kennedy. She switched on the radio and together they heard the news of Kennedy's assassination. In the same year, Heren was awarded one of the first John F. Kennedy Memorial Award for his book The New American Commonwealth, which likened the US Administration to a medieval court, with the president surrounded by a coterie of unelected, powerful advisors.

Heren remained in Washington, D.C. until 1971. It was his last overseas foreign posting before he was promoted to deputy editor and foreign editor under William Rees-Mogg at The Times.

=== London ===
Despite the difficulties of running a newspaper in the 1970s, he nurtured many notable talents, including Robert Fisk, Peter Hennessy and Paul Vallely. With his independent, earthy and instinctual style, he was not always happy within the confines of the editorial offices. In 1979, he oversaw the joint interviews, in The Times boardroom, with Sir Anthony Blunt after he was unmasked as the Fifth Man in the Cambridge Soviet spy ring. Heren drew fierce criticism from some newspapers after it became known he had asked for kippers to be brought in from a nearby smokehouse for Blunt's lunch. When Rupert Murdoch acquired the paper, Heren was the staff choice as Rees-Mogg's successor, but was passed over in favour of Harold Evans. He retired in 1981 after 48 years with The Times. "I loved my paper as a soldier loves his regiment," he declared.

== Personal life ==
Heren married Patricia Regan (died 1975). They had one son, Patrick, and three daughters, Kate, Sarah and Elizabeth, each born in a different country. They had a house in the Vale of Health in Hampstead.

== Death ==
Heren died in London on 26 January 1995.

== Legacy ==
Heren was one of a dwindling number of true foreign correspondents, able to spend years at their posts, embedded in the local cultures, and rarely able to return 'home'. His career mirrored the changing nature of The Times, from the years of Lord Astor's ownership, when stories were filed 'from our own correspondent' through to the years under Lord Thompson, and finally to the takeover by Rupert Murdoch when much to his dismay, society gossip was allowed into its pages and so beginning the end of its reputation as 'The Thunderer'.

Heren was a fierce defender of the independence of the press, and was unafraid of authority. He objected to being called a journalist, preferring to be described as a reporter. He said it was crucial to go out to where the story was and to speak directly to those involved. He is remembered by journalists for many stories and sayings, but the one that is still quoted today is: "When a politician tells you something in confidence, always ask yourself 'Why is this lying bastard lying to me?'" Although, as the man from The Times, he was able to relay the ideas and actions of the powerful to the world, his heart was really in reporting how the news affected ordinary people. He gave himself one last assignment in 1981 when Prime Minister Margaret Thatcher was threatening the British coal industry with closure. He travelled to Yorkshire and went underground with a shift of pit miners.

== Bibliography ==
- New American Commonwealth, 1968
- No Hail, No Farewell, 1970
- Growing up Poor in London, 1973
- The Story of America, 1976
- Growing up on The Times, 1978
- Alas, Alas for England: What Went Wrong with Britain, 1981
- The Power of the Press, Orbis, London, 1985 ISBN 0-85613-608-5

Media offices
Preceded by Edward Christian Hodgkin	Deputy Editor of The Times; 1973–1981	Succeeded by Charles Douglas-Home
