= Charles Wilson (journalist) =

Scottish journalist and newspaper executive (1935–2022)

- Born: Charles Martin Wilson; 18 August 1935; Glasgow, Scotland
- Died: 31 August 2022 (aged 87); Marylebone, London, England
- Education: Eastbank Academy
- Occupations: Journalist; editor; executive
- Spouses: Anne Robinson (m. 1968; div. 1973) Sally O'Sullivan (m. 1980; div. 2001) Rachel Pitkeathley (m. 2001)
- Children: 3

Charles Martin Wilson (18 August 1935 – 31 August 2022) was a Scottish journalist and newspaper executive.

== Early life and education ==
Charles Martin Wilson was born in Glasgow on 18 August 1935, and educated at Eastbank Academy in the east end of the city.

== Career ==
Having begun his career as a reporter for the News Chronicle and the Daily Mail, Wilson subsequently edited the Glasgow Evening Times, The Glasgow Herald and The Scottish Sunday Standard from 1976 to 1982, before moving to London to work as deputy editor (1982–1985) and editor (1985–1990) of The Times. From 1992 to 1998 he was managing director of Mirror Group plc (having been editorial director of the Group from 1991 to 1992). He was concurrently managing director and editor-in-chief of The Sporting Life (1990–1998), and also edited The Independent for a brief spell (1995–1996).

Once a Royal Marines boxing champion, he was feared but respected by many of those who worked for him, among them Matthew Parris, who cites him as an inspiration. American-born author Bill Bryson, who worked at the Times during Wilson's ascension to editor, described him as "a terrifying Scotsman and a Murdoch man through and through". Wilson, who oversaw a drastic cut in staff less than a year after his appointment (5250 workers, mostly from heavily unionized segments of the workforce), was remembered for his forceful demeanour, with Bryson recalling his announcement of the restructuring plan thus:

He said to us: 'We're sending ye tae Wapping, ye soft, English nancies, and if ye wairk very, very hard and if ye doonae git on ma tits, then mebbe I'll not cut off yer knackers and put them in ma Christmas pudding. D'ye have any problems with tha'?' Or words to that effect.

== Other activities ==
Wilson was appointed new Chairman of the Judges at British Press Awards 2006, as part of an effort to promote transparency and fairness in the judging process.

Wilson was the senior non-executive director of Chelsea and Westminster Hospital NHS Foundation Trust, where he made significant steps in assuring corporate governance.

== Personal life and death ==
Wilson was married to the broadcaster and journalist Anne Robinson and they had a daughter. He was later married to the journalist Sally O'Sullivan with whom he had a son and a daughter. They divorced in 2001, and later that year, he married amateur jockey Hon Rachel Pitkeathley, daughter of life peer Baroness Pitkeathley.

Wilson died from complications of blood cancer at The London Clinic, on 31 August 2022, aged 87.

Media offices
Preceded by Charles Douglas-Home	Deputy Editor of The Times; 1982–1985	Succeeded by Peter Stothard
Preceded by Charles Douglas-Home	Editor of The Times; 1985–1990	Succeeded by Simon Jenkins
Preceded by Ian Hargreaves	Editor of The Independent; 1995–1996	Succeeded by Andrew Marr
