= Henry Tombs =

English major general (1824–1874)

Major-General Sir Henry Tombs VC KCB
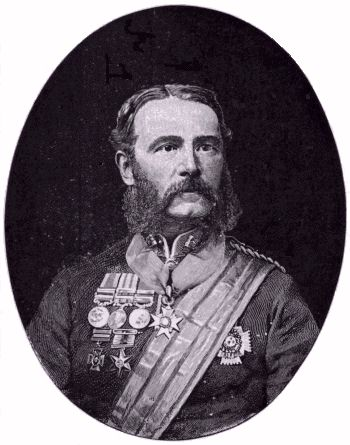
- Born: 10 November 1824; At sea, on passage to Calcutta, British India
- Died: 2 August 1874 (aged 49); Newport, Isle of Wight
- Burial place: Carisbrooke Cemetery
- Military career
- Allegiance: United Kingdom
- Branch: Bengal Army; British Army
- Service years: 1841–1874
- Rank: Major-General
- Units: Bengal Horse Artillery
- Commands: Royal Horse Artillery
- Conflicts: Gwalior campaign First Anglo-Sikh War; Second Anglo-Sikh War; Indian Mutiny; Bhutan War; Battle of Punniar; Battle of Moodkee; Battle of Ferozeshah; Battle of Aliwal; Battle of Ramnagar; Battle of Chillianwallah; Battle of Goojerat; Siege of Delhi; Siege of Lucknow
- Awards: Victoria Cross; Order of the Bath; Punniar Star; Sutlej Medal; Punjab Medal; Indian Mutiny Medal; India General Service Medal

Major-General Sir Henry Tombs VC KCB (10 November 1824 – 2 August 1874) was a British Army officer and a recipient of the Victoria Cross, the highest and most prestigious award for gallantry in the face of the enemy that can be awarded to British and Commonwealth forces.

== Early life ==
Henry Tombs was born at sea on passage to India on 10 November 1824. He was the youngest of seven to Major-General John Tombs, Bengal cavalry, and Mary Remington. He was sent back to England for an education during which time he studied at John Roysse's Free School in Abingdon-on-Thames (now Abingdon School). At the age of 15 he entered the East India Company's Military Seminary at Addiscombe, graduating in June 1841 and receiving a commission in the Bengal Horse Artillery. In 1869 he married Georgina Janet Stirling, the youngest daughter of Admiral Sir James Stirling. Their grandson Joseph Tombs received the VC for actions during World War I.

== Military career ==
Tombs received his commission as second lieutenant in the Bengal Horse Artillery on 11 June 1841, and first saw active service aged 19 during the Gwalior campaign. He distinguished himself while fighting at the December 1843 battle of Punniar with the No.16 Light Field Battery (horsedrawn), and was mentioned in dispatches and awarded the Punniar Star.

During the First Anglo-Sikh War (1845–1846) Tombs commanded a horse artillery troop at the battles of Moodkee and Ferozeshah, and was Aide-de-Camp to Lieutenant-General Sir Harry Smith at the battle of Aliwal. He was awarded a Sutlej Medal with two clasps (for Ferozeshuhur and Aliwal) in 1848.

During the Second Anglo-Sikh War (1848–1849), he served as Deputy Assistant Quartermaster General of Artillery. He was present at the battles of Ramnagar, Chillianwallah and Goojerat. He received the Punjab Medal with two clasps (for Chillianwallah and Goojerat) and was mentioned in dispatches. In 1854 he was promoted brevet Major for his services in the field.

Tombs saw service for a fourth time during the Indian Rebellion of 1857–1858, during which he commanded a troop of Horse Artillery. On 31 May 1857 his horse was shot from beneath him for the first time. He fought at the Battle of Badli-ki-Serai, where two horses were shot from under him. He was also present at the Siege of Delhi, during which he commanded the Bengal Horse Artillery contingent. It was during this siege, on 9 July 1857 that he performed the act of gallantry for which he was to be awarded the Victoria Cross. As a result of his and his troops' gallantry the unit was awarded the title of Tombs's Troop, which – as 28/143 Battery (Tombs's Troop), part of 19th Regiment Royal Artillery – it still carries to this day.

=== Victoria Cross ===
At the age of thirty-one, when a major in the Bengal Horse Artillery, Bengal Army during the Indian Mutiny, the following deed took place at the Siege of Delhi for which he and James Hills were awarded the VC:

Lieutenant-Colonel Henry Tombs, C.B., and Lieutenant James Hills

Date of Act of Bravery, 9th July, 1857

For very gallant conduct on the part of Lieutenant Hills before Delhi, in defending the position assigned to him in case of alarm, and for noble behaviour on the part of Lieutenant-Colonel Tombs in twice coming to his subaltern's rescue, and on each occasion killing his man.

(See despatch of Lieutenant-Colonel Mackenzie, Commanding 1st Brigade Horse Artillery, dated Camp, near Delhi, 10th July, 1857, published in the Supplement to the London Gazette of the 16th January, 1858.)

=== Later career ===
For services at the siege of Delhi, Tombs was promoted brevet lieutenant-colonel and made a Companion of the Order of the Bath in January 1858. In March 1858 he took part in the siege and capture of Lucknow before participating in a number of minor operations. He was promoted brevet colonel in July 1858, and lieutenant-colonel, Royal Artillery, in April 1861.

In 1864, as a brigadier-general, he served in the Bhutan War, commanding the force which recaptured Dewangiri Fort. Promoted major-general in March 1867 and made a Knight Commander of the Order of the Bath in March 1868, Tombs was appointed to command a division in 1871, first at Allahabad, then at Oudh. In 1874 he resigned his command due to ill health and died at Newport, Isle of Wight, on 2 August 1874, aged 49.

== Assessment ==
Field Marshall Frederick Roberts, 1st Earl Roberts, another junior officer in the Bengal Horse Artillery during the Indian Rebellion, and a recipient of the VC himself (Khudaganj, 2 January 1858) later wrote:

The hero of the day [when he won the VC] was Harry Tombs … an unusually handsome man and a thorough soldier. … I had always heard of Tombs as one of the best officers in the regiment. …. As a cool, bold leader of men Tombs was unsurpassed: no fire, however hot, and no crisis, however unexpected, could take him by surprise; he grasped the situation in a moment, and issued his orders without hesitation, inspiring all ranks with confidence in his power and capacity. He was somewhat of a martinet, and was more feared than liked by his men until they realized what a grand leader he was, when they gave him their entire confidence, and were ready to follow him anywhere and everywhere.

At news of Tombs's death, the Commander-in-Chief, India, Lord Napier issued a general order expressing regret at the loss of "so distinguished an officer".

== The medal ==
His Victoria Cross is displayed at the Royal Artillery Museum, Woolwich, London.
