= Henry Ponsonby =

British soldier and royal court official

Major-General The Right Honourable Sir Henry Ponsonby GCB
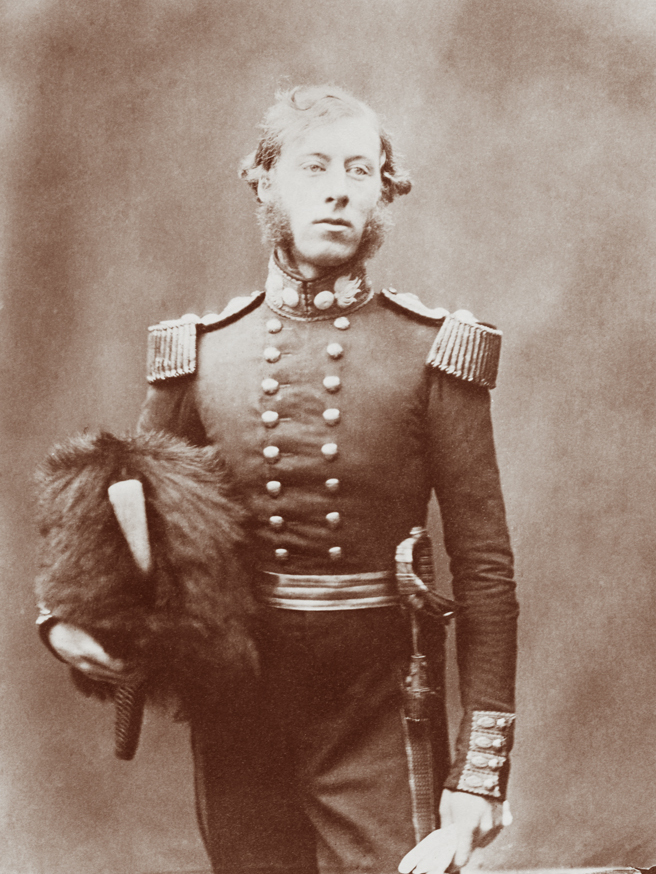
- Ponsonby in 1854

Private Secretary to the Sovereign
- In office 1870–1895
- Monarch: Victoria
- Preceded by: Sir Charles Grey
- Succeeded by: Sir Arthur Bigge

Personal details
- Born: Henry Frederick Ponsonby; 10 December 1825 Corfu, United States of the Ionian Islands British Protectorate
- Died: 21 November 1895 (aged 69) East Cowes, Isle of Wight, United Kingdom
- Spouse: Mary Elizabeth Bulteel
- Children: 5, including John, Frederick and Arthur
- Parent(s): Sir Frederick Ponsonby; Lady Emily Charlotte Bathurst

Major-General Sir Henry Frederick Ponsonby (10 December 1825 – 21 November 1895) was a British soldier and royal court official who served as Queen Victoria's Private Secretary.

== Biography ==
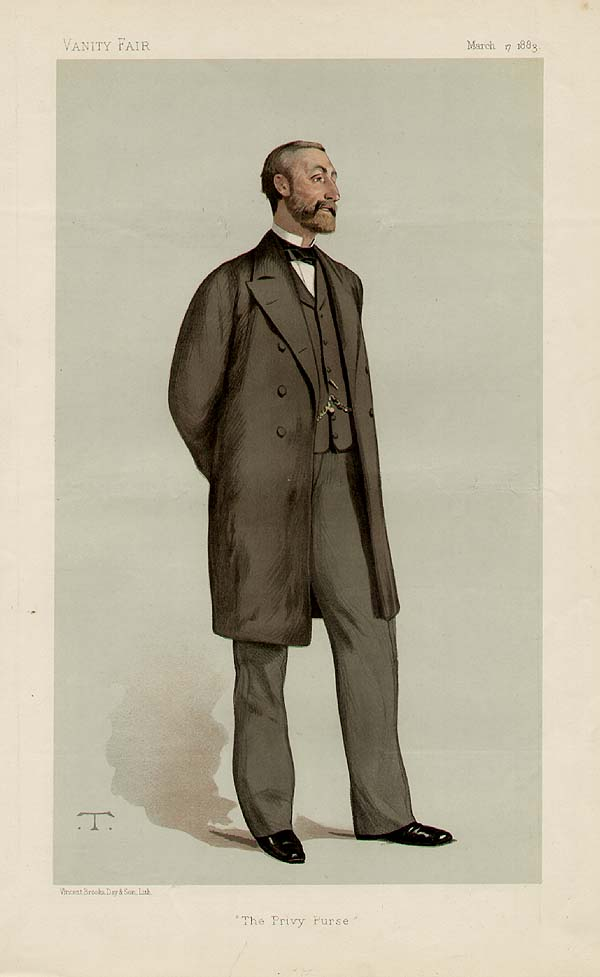
'The Privy Purse'. Ponsonby as caricatured by Théobald Chartran in Vanity Fair, March 1883

Born in Corfu, he was the son of Major-General Sir Frederick Ponsonby, an Anglo-Irish nobleman who was a senior commander in the British Army.

He entered the army on 27 December 1842 as an ensign in the 49th Regiment of Foot. Transferred to the Grenadier Guards, he became a lieutenant on 16 February 1844, captain on 18 July 1848, and major on 19 October 1849 (all promotions by purchase). From 1847 to 1858 he was aide-de-camp to Lord Clarendon and Lord St. Germans, successively lord-lieutenants of Ireland. He served through the Crimean campaigns of 1855–1856, becoming lieutenant-colonel on 31 Aug. 1855; for the action before Sebastopol he received a medal with clasp, the Turkish medal, and the Order of the Medjidie, 3rd Class. After the peace he was appointed equerry to Albert, Prince Consort, who greatly valued his services. On 2 August 1860 he became colonel, and in 1862, after the death of the prince, he was sent to Canada in command of a battalion of the Grenadier Guards which was stationed in the colony during the American Civil War. On 6 March 1868 he became a major-general.

He served as Keeper of the Privy Purse and Private Secretary to Queen Victoria. His appointment occurred on 8 April 1870, after the death of the previous Private Secretary, General Sir Charles Grey.

On 6 January 1895 he was paralysed by a stroke, leading to his retirement from office in May that year. He died on 21 November at East Cowes on the Isle of Wight. He was buried there at St Mildred's Church, Whippingham, not far from Osborne House.

== Family ==
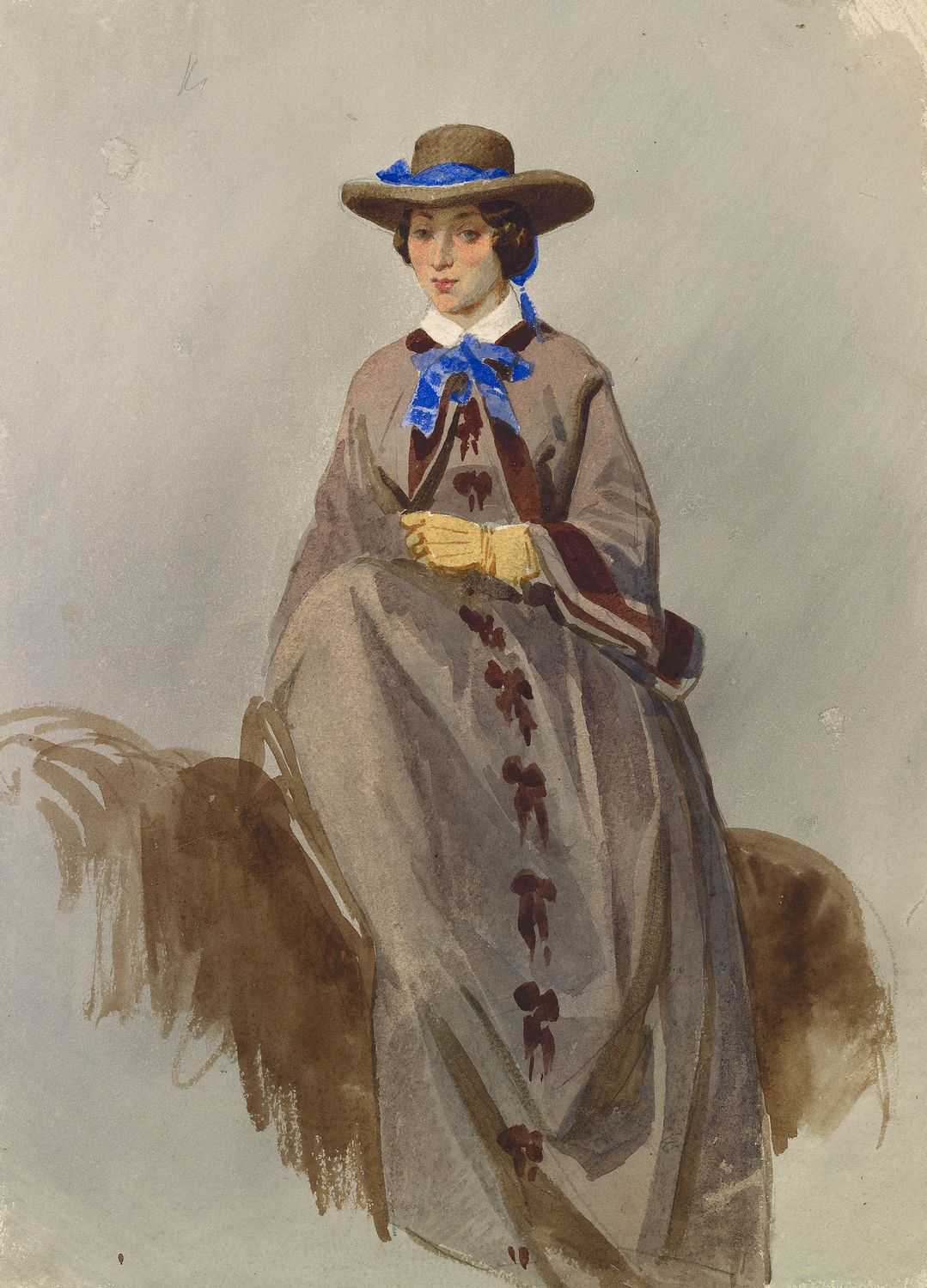
Mary Elizabeth Bulteel, Lady Ponsonby

On 30 April 1861, Ponsonby married Hon. Mary Elizabeth Bulteel, Maid of Honour to Queen Victoria and a daughter of John Crocker Bulteel (1793–1843). The couple had five children:

- Alberta Victoria Ponsonby (6 May 1862 – 15 October 1945)
- Magdalen Ponsonby (24 June 1864 – 1 July 1934)
- John Ponsonby (25 March 1866 – 26 March 1952)
- Frederick Edward Grey Ponsonby (16 September 1867 – 20 October 1935)
- Arthur Augustus William Harry Ponsonby (16 February 1871 – 24 March 1946)

Lady Caroline Lamb (née Ponsonby), his father's sister, had been married to Lord Melbourne, who was prime minister to Queen Victoria during her first years on the throne.

Both Arthur and Mary Ponsonby contributed pseudonymously to magazines and newspapers of the day.

Ponsonby embellished letters to his children at Eton with a series of illustrations in which he concealed the school's address. It was a family quirk continued by his son Arthur, and recently revived by descendant Harriet Russell. His letters bore addresses appearing as doodled signposts in snowstorms or as huge envelopes shouldered by tiny people.

== Legacy ==
Ponsonby's son Arthur wrote a biography of him which won the James Tait Black Memorial Prize in 1942: Henry Ponsonby, Queen Victoria's Private Secretary: His Life from His Letters.

Ponsonby was portrayed by Geoffrey Palmer in the 1997 film Mrs. Brown, and by Tim Pigott-Smith in the 2017 film Victoria & Abdul (Judi Dench played Queen Victoria in both films).

Court offices
Preceded by Sir Thomas Myddelton Biddulph	Keeper of the Privy Purse; 1878–1895	Succeeded by Sir Fleetwood Edwards
Preceded by Sir Charles Grey	Private Secretary to the Sovereign; 1870–1895	Succeeded by Sir Arthur Bigge
