= Georgie Fame =

English R&B and jazz musician (born 1943)

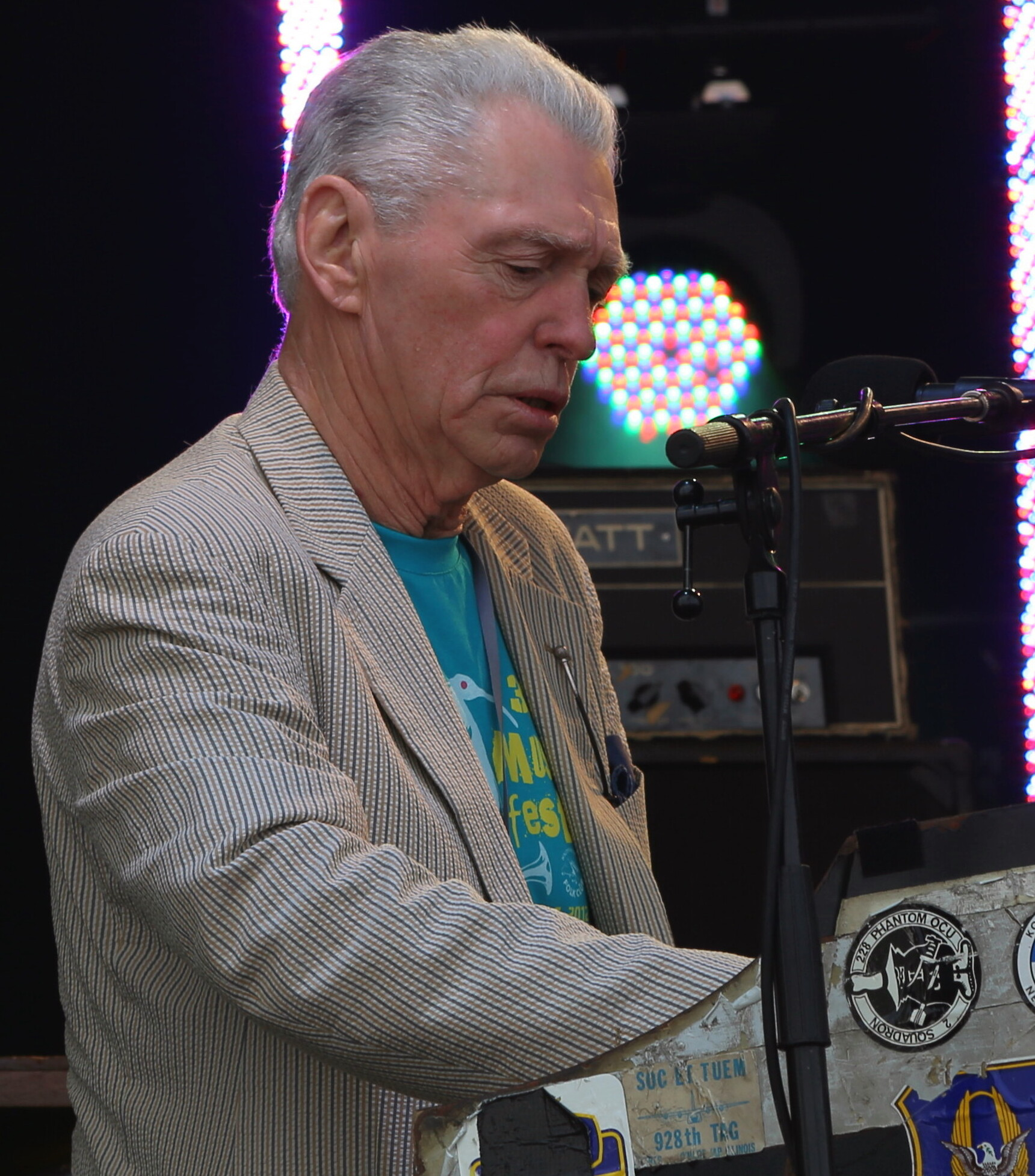
- Fame at Concert at the Kings, 2013

Background information
- Also known as: Georgie Fortune
- Born: Clive Powell; 26 June 1943 (age 83); Leigh, Lancashire, England
- Genres: Soul jazz; R&B; pop; soul; jazz
- Occupations: Musician; singer
- Instruments: Keyboards; vocals; guitar
- Years active: 1959–present
- Labels: Imperial; Island; Chrysalis; RSO; Polydor; Columbia; Pye; Decca; FFRR; Parrot; London

Georgie Fame (born Clive Powell; 26 June 1943) is an English R&B and jazz musician. Fame, who had a string of 1960s hits, is still performing, often working with contemporaries such as Alan Price, Van Morrison and Bill Wyman. Fame is the only British music act to have achieved three UK No. 1 hits with his only top 10 chart entries: "Yeh, Yeh" in 1964, "Get Away" in 1966 and "The Ballad of Bonnie and Clyde" in 1968.

== Biography ==
=== Early life ===
Powell was born at 1 Cotton Street, Leigh, Lancashire, England. He took piano lessons from the age of seven. On leaving Leigh Central County Secondary School at 15, he worked for a brief period in a cotton mill, spending his evenings playing piano for a band called the Dominoes. After taking part in a singing contest at the Butlins Holiday Camp in Pwllheli, North Wales, he was offered a job there by the band leader, early British rock-and-roll star Rory Blackwell.

At sixteen years of age, Powell went to London and, on the recommendation of Lionel Bart, entered into a management agreement with Larry Parnes, who had given new stage names to artists Marty Wilde and Billy Fury. Fame later recalled that Parnes had given him an ultimatum over his forced change of name: "It was very much against my will but he said, 'If you don't use my name, I won't use you in the show'".

Over the following year Fame toured the UK playing beside Wilde, Joe Brown, Dickie Pride, Gene Vincent, Eddie Cochran and others. Fame played piano for Billy Fury in his backing band, the Blue Flames. When the backing band got the sack at the end of 1961, it was re-billed as "Georgie Fame and the Blue Flames" and went on to enjoy great success with a repertoire largely of rhythm and blues numbers.

=== The Blue Flames ===
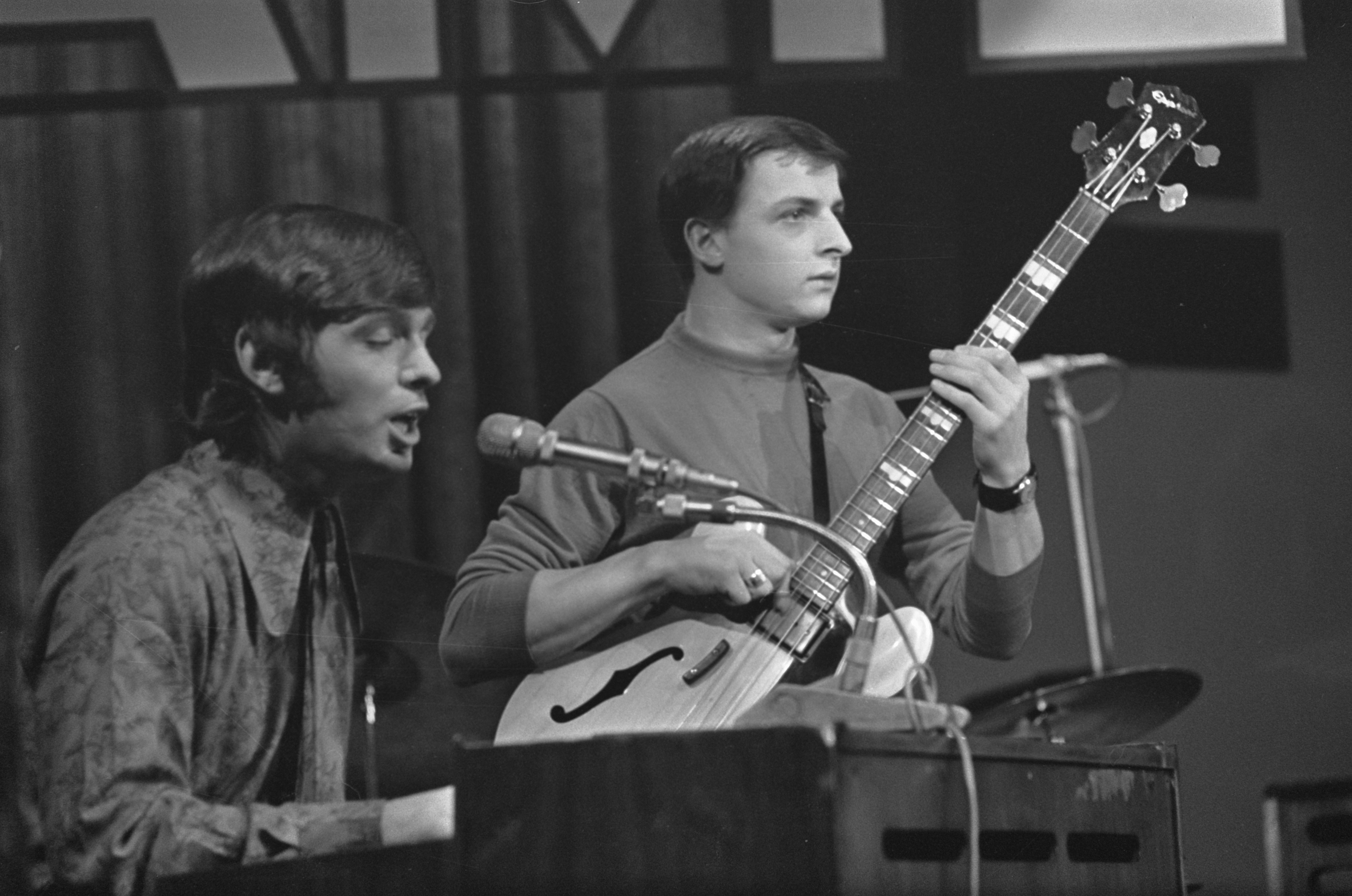
Fame and Rick Brown performing at The Grand Gala du Disque, Amsterdam, on Saturday 2 October 1966

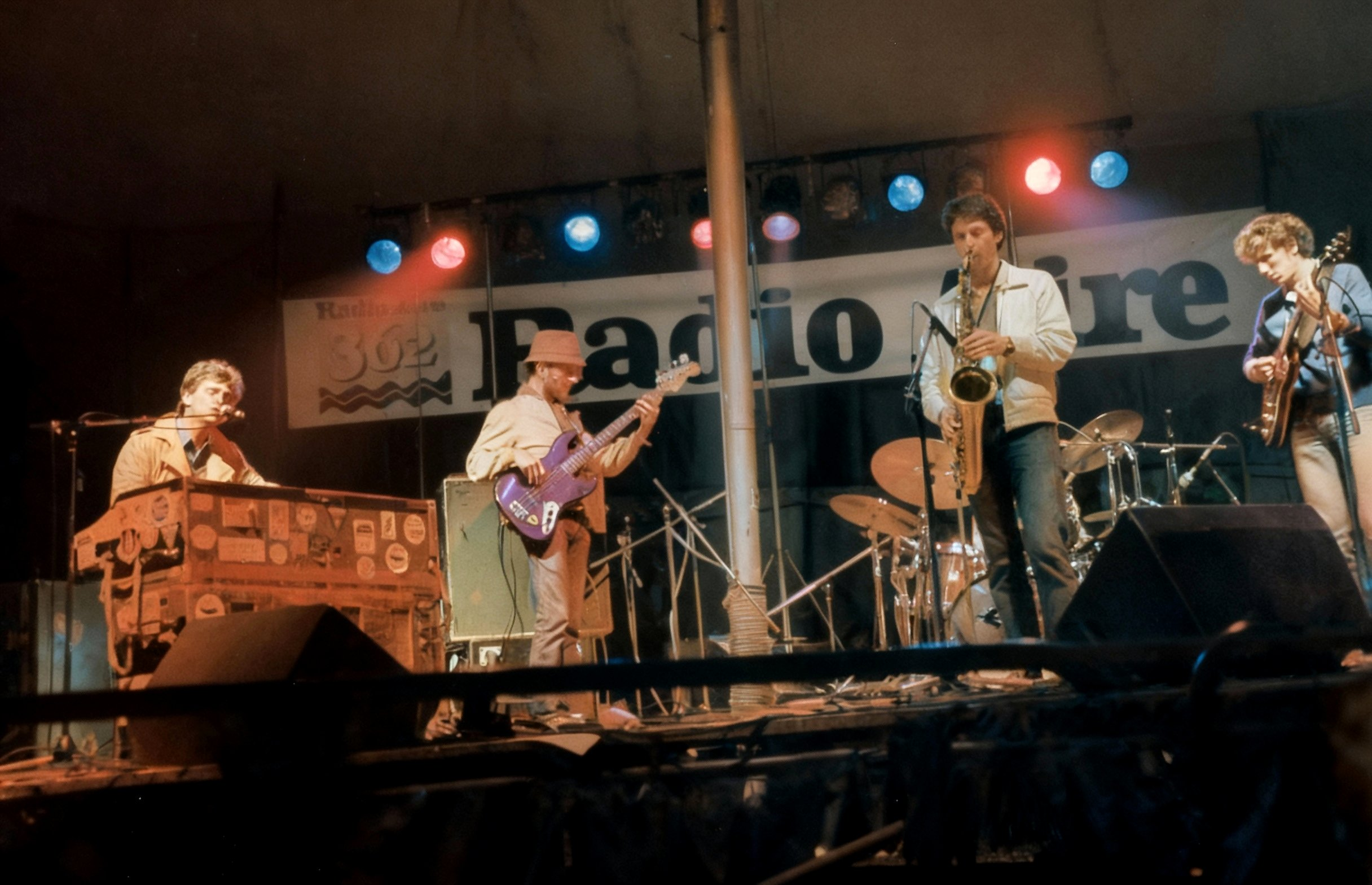
Fame performing with the "Aussie Blue Flames" at the 1983 Leeds Folk Festival

Fame was influenced by jazz, blues and the musicians Mose Allison and Willie Mabon. He was one of the first white musicians to be influenced by ska after hearing it in cafés in Jamaica and Ladbroke Grove in England. In the early 1960s Fame and his band appeared regularly at The Flamingo Club, a London "cool jazz" club, which Fame recalled as "full of American GIs who came in from their bases for the weekend" who played for him the song "Green Onions" by Booker T. & the M.G.'s. "I had been playing piano up to that point but I bought a Hammond organ the next day." Bill Wyman of the Rolling Stones described Fame at this point in his career as "an incredibly good pianist and singer" and "the idol of the large contingent of blacks" who frequented the Flamingo.

In 1963, the band recorded its debut album, Rhythm and Blues at the Flamingo. Produced by Ian Samwell and engineered by Glyn Johns, the album was released in place of a planned single by EMI Columbia. It failed to reach the chart, but the October 1964 follow-up, Fame at Last, reached No. 15 on the UK Albums Chart.

Ronan O'Rahilly failed to get Fame's first record played by the BBC. After it was rejected by Radio Luxembourg, O'Rahilly announced he would start his own radio station to promote the record. The station became the offshore pirate radio station Radio Caroline.

Fame enjoyed continual chart success, with three number one hits in the UK singles chart. His version of "Yeh, Yeh", released on 14 January 1965, spent two weeks at No. 1 on the UK singles chart and one week at No. 1 in Canada. "In the Meantime" charted in the UK, Canada, and US. Fame made his US television debut that same year on Hullabaloo. His single "Get Away", released on 21 July 1966, spent one week at No. 1 on the UK chart and 11 weeks on the chart, and one week at No. 1 in Canada. The song was written as a jingle for a petrol commercial. His version of the Bobby Hebb song "Sunny" made No. 13 in the UK charts in September 1966. His greatest chart success was in 1967 when "The Ballad of Bonnie and Clyde" became a number one hit in the UK and Canada, and number seven in the US. "Yeh, Yeh" and "The Ballad of Bonnie and Clyde" sold over one million copies and were awarded gold discs.

==== Popular culture ====
Two of the band's recordings, "Pink Champagne" and "Yeh, Yeh", were featured in the 2020 Netflix series The Queen's Gambit.

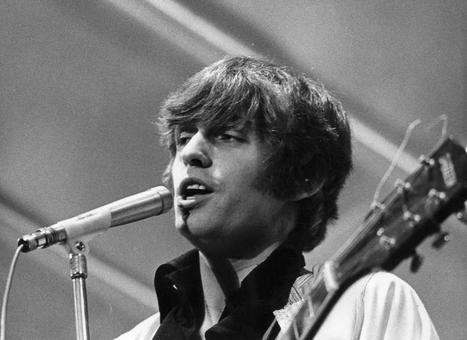
Fame at Gröna Lund, Stockholm, 1968

=== Solo ===
Fame continued playing into the 1970s, having a hit with "Rosetta" with his friend Alan Price in 1971, and they worked together extensively. In 1974, he reunited the Blue Flames and began to sing with European orchestras and big bands. He wrote jingles for radio and TV commercials and composed for the films Entertaining Mr Sloane (1970) and The Alf Garnett Saga (1972). He also had an acting role as a pop star in the rarely-seen 1968 film The Mini-Affair, with music provided by the Bee Gees.

The artist released two singles produced by Stock Aitken Waterman in 1986, a cover of Richie Cole's "New York Afternoon" (credited as Mondo Kané featuring Dee Lewis, Coral Gordon and Georgie Fame), and a cover of a Gilberto Gil track, "Samba", under his own name, for which he wrote the English-language lyrics.

He became a member of Van Morrison's band, as well as his musical producer. He played keyboards and sang harmony vocals on "In the Days Before Rock 'n' Roll" from the album Enlightenment while recording and touring as a solo act. He played organ on Van Morrison's albums between 1989 and 1997, and starred at Terry Dillon's 60th birthday party on 10 May 2008. Morrison refers to Fame in the line "I don't run into Mr. Clive" in his song "Don't Go to Nightclubs Anymore" on the 2008 Keep It Simple album. Fame appeared as a guest on Morrison's television concert presented by BBC Four on 25 and 27 April 2008.

Fame was a founding member of Bill Wyman's band Rhythm Kings. He also worked with Count Basie, Eric Clapton, Muddy Waters, Joan Armatrading and the Verve.

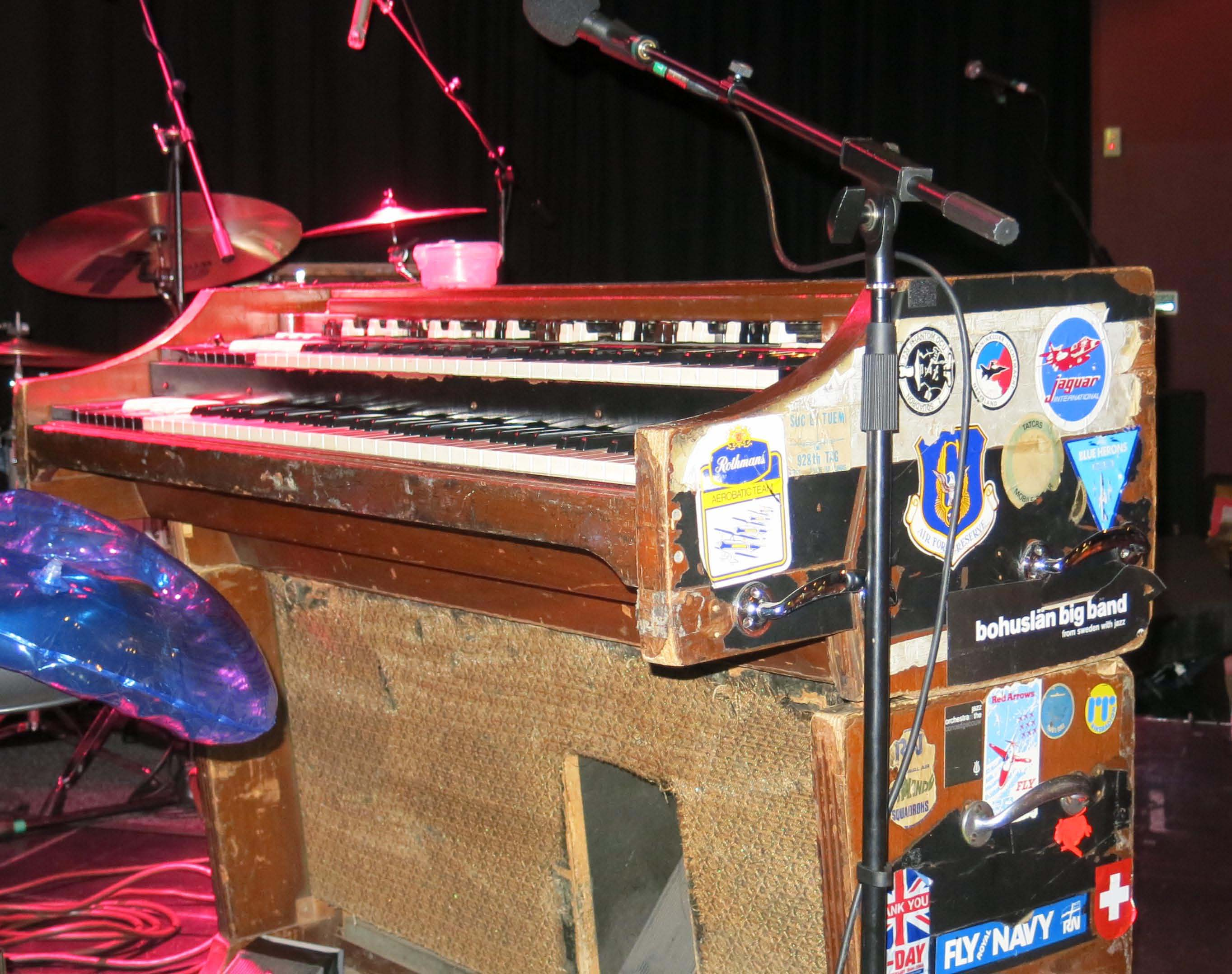
Fame's Hammond A100

Fame has played residences at Ronnie Scott's Jazz Club. He played organ on Starclub's album. He was the headline act on the Sunday night at the Jazz World stage at the 2009 Glastonbury Festival after performing at the Midsummer Music at Spencers festival in Essex.

On 18 April 2010, Fame and his sons Tristan Powell (guitar) and James Powell (drums) performed at the Live Room at Twickenham Stadium for the tenth birthday celebrations of The Eel Pie Club. Part of the proceeds from the concert benefitted the Otakar Kraus Music Trust, which provides music and voice therapy for children and young people with physical and mental difficulties. The trio performed later that year at the Towersey Festival.

In July 2014, Fame played at the village hall in Goring-on-Thames and then at the Cornbury Festival in Oxfordshire.

== Personal life ==
In 1972, Fame married Nicolette (née Harrison), Marchioness of Londonderry, the former wife of the 9th Marquess. Lady Londonderry had given birth to one of Fame's children during her marriage to the marquess; the child, Tristan, bore the courtesy title Viscount Castlereagh and was believed to be heir to the marquisate. When tests determined the child was Fame's, the Londonderrys divorced. The couple had another son, James, during their marriage.

Nicolette Powell committed suicide on 13 August 1993 by jumping off the Bristol Clifton Suspension Bridge. Media accounts reported that she left a note and her car keys with two bystanders.

In an interview prior to her suicide, Fame said that they had stayed happily married because of her "charm, beauty, forbearance and understanding".

Fame supports the Countryside Alliance and has played concerts to raise funds for the organisation.
