= Mary Bulteel, Lady Ponsonby =

English noblewoman (1832–1916)

- Lady Ponsonby in 1906
- Born: Mary Elizabeth Bulteel; 1832
- Died: 1916 (aged 83–84)
- Occupation: Royal courtier
- Spouse: Henry Ponsonby
- Children: 5, including Arthur Ponsonby
- Father: John Crocker Bulteel

Mary Elizabeth Bulteel, Lady Ponsonby (1832–1916) was an English noblewoman and a royal courtier to Queen Victoria. She supported women's employment, writing, and higher education by writing articles for periodicals and contributing to the foundation of Girton College, Cambridge.

== Life ==
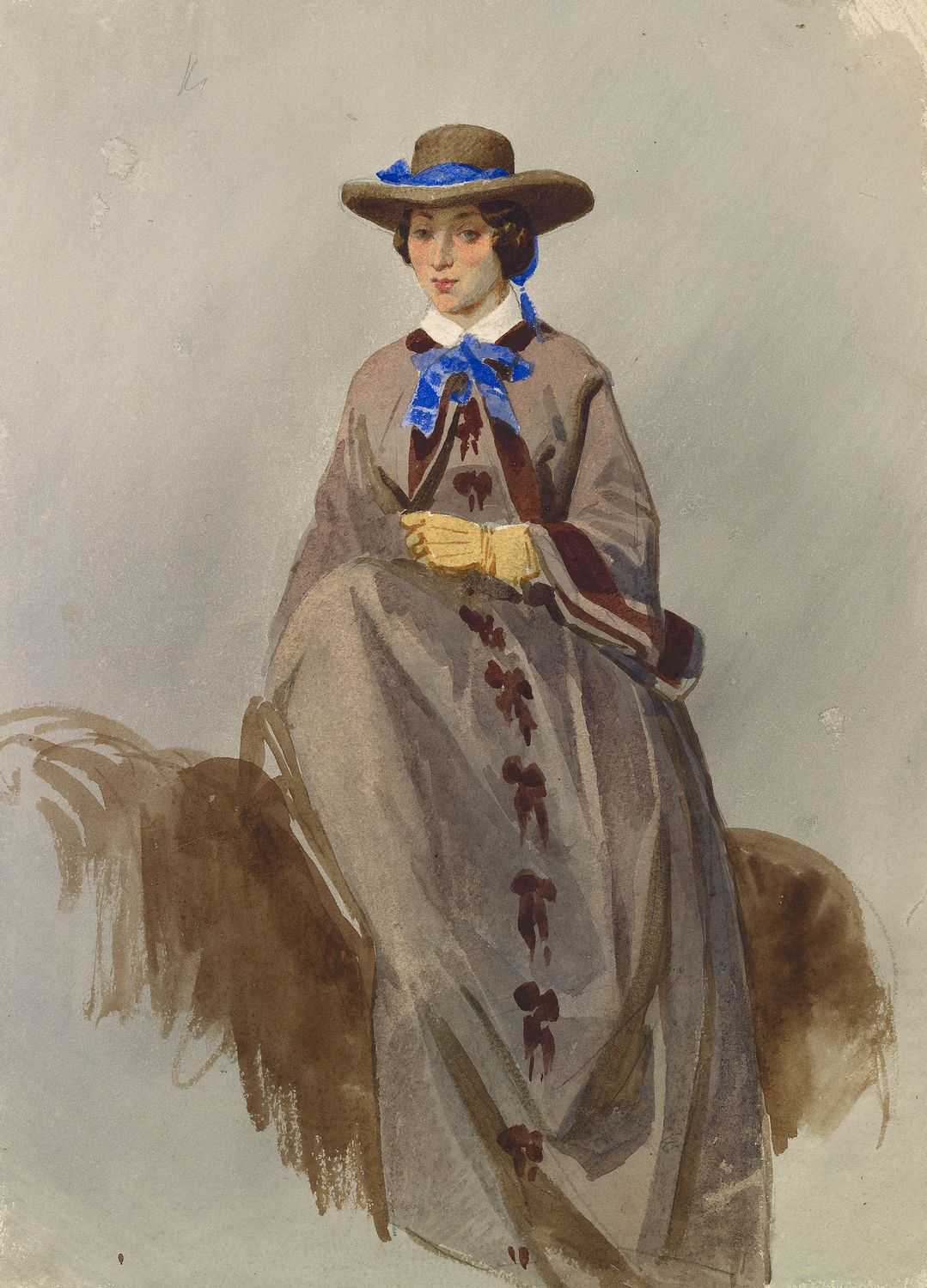
The Hon. Mary Bulteel by Carl Haag

She was born Mary Elizabeth Bulteel in 1832, the eldest daughter of Whig MP John Crocker Bulteel. Her maternal grandfather was Prime Minister Charles Grey, 2nd Earl Grey.

She was Maid of Honour to Queen Victoria 1853–61 and Extra Woman of the Bedchamber 1895–1901.

On 20 April 1861, having broken off an engagement to William Vernon Harcourt, she married Sir Henry Ponsonby, an equerry who was appointed Queen Victoria’s private secretary in 1870. The couple lived in the Norman Tower, the former prison wing of Windsor Castle. They had five children:

- Alberta Ponsonby, known as Betty, author of a book of poetry, The Rose and the Fire (1908)
- Magdalen Ponsonby, a member of the Pioneer Players who wrote a satirical play, Idle Women: A Study in Futility (1914)
- John Ponsonby, an army officer
- Frederick Ponsonby, 1st Baron Sysonby, a soldier and courtier
- Arthur Ponsonby, 1st Baron Ponsonby of Shrublede, a Labour MP and writer.

== Writing and campaigning ==
Lady Ponsonby published articles in periodicals including Nineteenth Century. The causes she supported included women’s higher education. She was on the committee that planned the foundation Girton College, Cambridge, and remained a member of Girton College from 1871 until her death. She also served on a committee for the employment of women with Jessie Boucherett in the 1870s. Her opinions were deemed liberal at Queen Victoria's court and she was suspected of exerting too much influence over her husband.

Lady Ponsonby supported the career of Vernon Lee. Her other literary friends included George Eliot and Ethel Smyth.

In 1901, shortly after Queen Victoria’s death, Lady Ponsonby collaborated with Edmund Gosse on an article for the Quarterly Review, ‘The Character of Queen Victoria’. This drew criticism because of its not entirely positive characterisation of the late Queen.

== Legacy ==
Lady Ponsonby’s memoir was published by her daughter Magdalen in 1927, and gives historians an insight into Queen Victoria’s court. Her family donated money for a Mary Ponsonby Prize in Modern Languages to be awarded by Girton College.
