= Doreen Wells =

English ballet dancer

Doreen, Marchioness of Londonderry
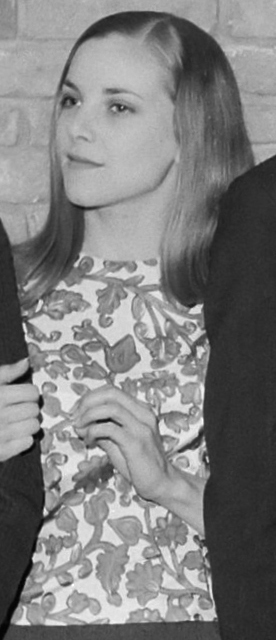
- Doreen Wells in 1964
- Born: Doreen Patricia Wells; 25 June 1937 (age 89); London, England
- Spouse: Alistair Vane-Tempest-Stewart, 9th Marquess of Londonderry (m. 1972; div. 1989)
- Issue: Frederick Vane-Tempest-Stewart, 10th Marquess of Londonderry; Lord Reginald Alexander Vane-Tempest-Stewart
- Occupation: Ballet dancer

Doreen Patricia Vane-Tempest-Stewart, Marchioness of Londonderry (née Wells; born 25 June 1937) is a British former ballet dancer.

== Career ==
Born in London, Wells received her early dance training at the Bush Davies School of Theatre Arts, continuing her studies at the Sadler's Wells Ballet School. She is a winner of the Adeline Genée Gold Medal from the Royal Academy of Dance. She made her professional stage debut in pantomime, before ultimately joining the Sadler's Wells Theatre Ballet.

In theatre, she has performed roles in West End musicals, including the leading role of Vera Baranova in On Your Toes at the Palace Theatre and Maggie Jones in 42nd Street at the Theatre Royal, Drury Lane. She has also made television appearances including the 1985 Royal Variety Performance and a BBC Christmas Extravaganza.

On 1 December 2009, she made an appearance on The Paul O'Grady Show, performing a dance routine with male backing dancers. She was then interviewed by O'Grady and spoke of her continued love for dance and about how she still performs regularly.

In March 2010, Wells took part in a retrospective of her career at the London Jewish Cultural Centre.

== Marriage ==
Wells married Alistair Vane-Tempest-Stewart, 9th Marquess of Londonderry, son of the 8th Marquess of Londonderry and Romaine Combe, on 10 March 1972. Together, they have two sons before their divorce in 1989. However, Wells retains the title of Marchioness of Londonderry.

== Awards ==
- Adeline Genée Gold Medal
