= John Tombs =

- Born: 1777; Abingdon-on-Thames
- Died: 1848 (aged 70–71); Malta
- Military career
- Allegiance: United Kingdom
- Branch: British Indian Army
- Rank: Major General
- Commands: 3rd Bengal Cavalry
- Conflicts: Siege of Bharatpur

Major-General John Tombs (1777–1848) was an officer in the British East India Company.

== Education ==
John Tombs was the son of a banker, Joseph Tombs (1745–1818), of Abingdon-on-Thames. He was educated at John Roysse's Free School in Abingdon (now Abingdon School).

== Military career ==
He entered service with the East India Company. He commanded the 3rd Bengal Cavalry at the Siege of Bharatpur (1825–26) and was promoted to major-general in 1838. He retired from the Indian Army to Malta where he died. He sent his six sons home to Abingdon for an English education, the most distinguished of them being the sixth son, Major-General Sir Henry Tombs, VC, KCB (1825–1874).

== See also ==
- List of Old Abingdonians

== Sources ==
- Hammond, Nigel (December 2004). "Tombs of Abingdon". Oxfordshire Family Historian. 18 (3).
