= Luke Douglas-Home =

British chartered environmentalist

- Born: United Kingdom
- Occupation: Environmentalist

Luke Douglas-Home is a British chartered environmentalist (CEnv) and environmental campaign activist. He works with schools, councils and governments on improving environmental impacts and reducing pollution.

== Career ==
Douglas-Home founded A Future without Rubbish in 2016. The organization provides consultancy, campaigns and education in reducing waste. He has educated school pupils in Romania, India and the UK about the circular economy, the UN's SDGs and the waste hierarchy.

Douglas-Home is a fellow Environmentalist with Chris Packham and is referred to as The Uk’s litter-picking Forrest Gump. He speaks and presents to conferences, councils and schools on the subject of plastic pollution.

He founded the #StirCrazy campaign in 2018 with the goal of banning plastic stirrers and another One Bag Zero Waste Campaign in 2022, making it mandatory that packaging included recycled used material. #StirCrazy was legislatively successful in 2020 in the UK.

=== Coastline Runner ===
In 2021, Douglas-Home initiated a program to reduce plastic pollution on British coastline and raise awareness of the damage plastic pollution has on oceans, He has been called by media as The Coastline Runner. As of May 2023, he has run over 500 km of the east coast of England and collected more than 500 kg of foreshore plastic, while running, researching investigating how it can be reduced, he is also raising funds for the initiative mission and runs elsewhere.

The Coastline Runner is aiming to run and swim as much of coastlines as possible within the first years of the UN's ‘Decade of Ocean Science’, collecting shoreline plastic.

In September 2023, Douglas-Home represented the UK in the World Plogging Championship (WPC) in Genoa, Italy. The championship involves jogging and litter-picking. He is tasked with forming the 'Team GB' for the WPC in 2024, as described in Runners World, in 2024 and on Good Morning Britain with Kate Garraway and Richard Madeley.

== Personal life ==
Luke Douglas-Home is the son of Charles Douglas-Home (journalist) and author Jessica Douglas-Home (Gwynne), grandson of Lady Margaret Spencer, Therefore, he is the second cousin of Diana, Princess of Wales.

He had a brain injury in 2005 and made a film about it, called Nobody Knows. In 2009, he made a film to raise money for medical care in Romania.

Douglas-Home is also a sailor and has been featured on Joyrider TV with sailor Joe Bennet.
