= John Crocker Bulteel =

English politician (1793–1843)

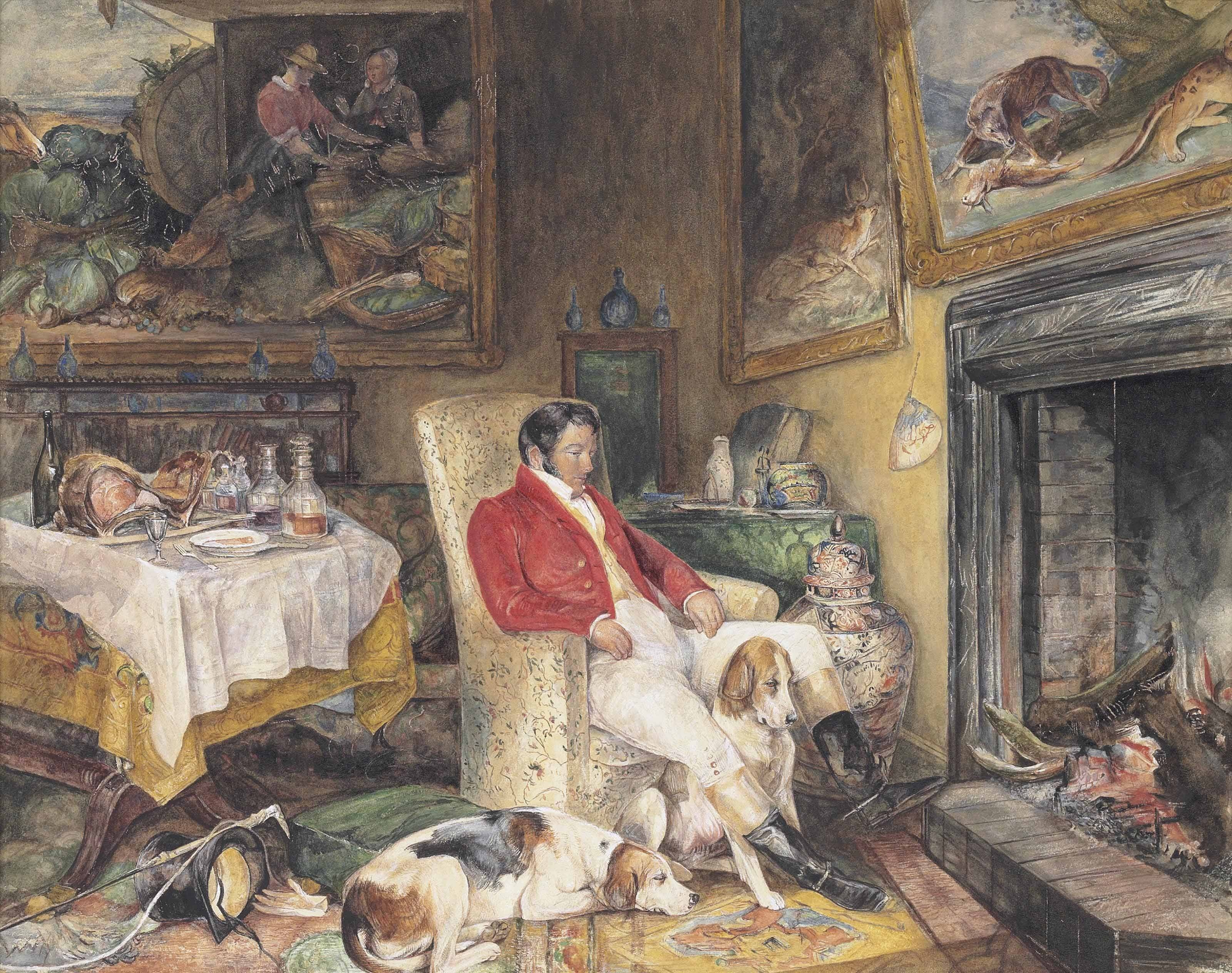
John Crocker Bulteel, depicted in his hunting attire with two of his favourite foxhounds, watercolour by John Frederick Lewis (1805–1876), private collection

John Crocker Bulteel (1793–1843) of Fleet, Holbeton, in South Devon, was a Whig MP for South Devon 1832-4 and was Sheriff of Devon in 1841. He was Master of the Dartmoor Foxhounds and bred the finest pack of hounds in England.

== Origins ==
He was the son and heir of John II Bulteel (1763–1837) of Flete in the parish of Holbeton and of Lyneham in the parish of Yealmpton, Devon, by his wife Elizabeth Perring (d.1835), whose monument survives in the chancel of All Saints Church, Holbeton, daughter of Thomas Perring (1732–1791), a merchant of Modbury in Devon and of London. Thomas's brother was Peter Perring of Membland, a member of the Council at Madras, who made a fortune in the East India Company, and purchased Membland from John I Bulteel (1733–1801), father of John II. John II Bulteel was Sheriff of Devon in 1807/8. His earliest recorded ancestor in England was Samuel Bulteel (d.1682) of Tavistock in Devon, a Huguenot refugee from France, whose son was James Bulteel (1676–1757) of Tavistock, MP for Tavistock 1703-8 and 1711–15, who married Mary Crocker, daughter and heiress of Courtenay Crocker (d.1740), MP, of Lyneham in the parish of Yealmpton, Devon, the last male of the senior branch of the ancient Crocker family.

James Bulteel inherited the estate of Fleet (alias Fleet Damarell), one of the finest estates in Devon, under the will of Richard Hele (d.1709) of Flete, who was no blood relation. James's son was John Bulteel (1733–1801), who in 1757 purchased the estate of Membland, in the parish of Holbeton.

== Education and career ==
He attended Plympton Grammar School in Devon (where Sir Joshua Reynolds had been educated) and where a fellow-pupil was Jack Russell (1795–1883), later the famous hunting parson. Bulteel and Russell fought on one occasion whilst at school, when Bulteel received a black eye from Russell, but in later life became firm friends sharing a common passion for hunting.

He was MP for South Devon 1832–4 and was Sheriff of Devon in 1841. In about 1835 he remodelled his residence at Fleet House to his own castellated Gothic design.

== Hunting ==
During his father's life he lived as a young man at the family's secondary seat of Lyneham, while his father resided at Fleet. He was the originator of the Lyneham Pack of foxhounds, afterwards famous under the mastership of Mr. Trelawny. He was later Master of the Dartmoor Foxhounds.

A six-verse poem on the subject of Bulteel, in the style of Sir Walter Scott's The Young Lochinvar was published in 1828 in the Sporting Magazine, of which the first verse was as follows:

Oh the young Squire of Fleet is come into the West
From the packs of the Kingdom his drafts are the best
Save Jack Square and Dick Ellis attendants he's none
He feeds them himself and he hunts them alone
If he keeps to his point and he stands on his feet,
There'll be never a man like the young Squire of Fleet.

== Marriage and children ==
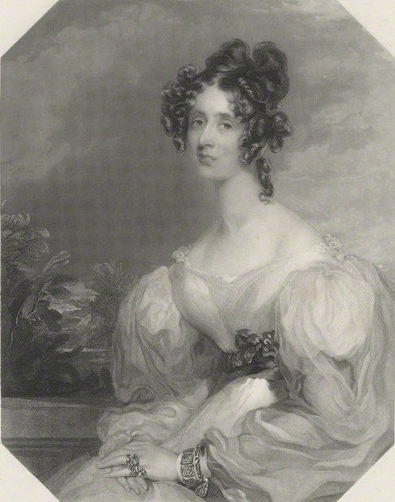
Lady Elizabeth Grey (d.1880), wife of John Crocker Bulteel (1793–1843) of Fleet, engraving by Henry Bryan Hall, after William Say, published 1841; National Portrait Gallery, London, NPG D32379

In 1826 he married Lady Elizabeth Grey (d.1880), 2nd daughter of the UK prime minister Charles Grey, 2nd Earl Grey (1764–1845), by whom he had the following children:

- John Bulteel (1827–1897), son and heir, who in 1863 sold Fleet to an Australian sheep farmer and moved his residence to Pamflete in the same parish of Holbeton. Fleet was repurchased by his brother-in-law Henry Bingham Mildmay (d.1905) of Shoreham Place in Kent, a partner in Barings Bank married to his sister Georgiana Bulteel (d.1899) and father of Francis Bingham Mildmay, 1st Baron Mildmay of Flete (1861–1947).
- Mary Elizabeth Bulteel (21 Sep 1832–1916), eldest daughter, a Maid of Honour to Queen Victoria, who in 1861 married Sir Henry Ponsonby (1825–1895), private secretary and equerry to Queen Victoria and Keeper of the Privy Purse.
- Georgiana Bulteel (1834-1899), who in 1860 married Henry Bingham Mildmay (d.1905) of Shoreham Place in Kent, a partner in Barings Bank and was mother of Francis Bingham Mildmay, 1st Baron Mildmay of Flete (1861–1947). She was the heiress of Fleet, from which estate her son took his title. The 1st Baron's daughter and sole heiress was Hon. Helen Mildmay (born 1907) who had also inherited the estate of Mothecombe, in the parish of Holbeton, purchased in 1872 by her grandfather Henry Bingham Mildmay (d.1905), where she lived with her husband Lt Commander Richard Mildmay-White, who in 1958 adopted the additional surname Mildmay by deed poll.
- Louisa Emily Charlotte Bulteel (1839-1892), who in 1861 married Edward Baring, 1st Baron Revelstoke (1828–1897) of Membland in the parish of Holbeton. He was a senior partner of Barings Bank, which had originated in Exeter, Devon. Among their children was Margaret Baring, who married Charles Spencer, 6th Earl Spencer. Membland had been purchased in 1757 by John I Bulteel (1733–1801) (grandfather of John Crocker Bulteel) and was promptly sold by him to Peter Perring (d.1796) of Modbury (uncle of Elizabeth Perring the wife of John Crocker Bulteel), who had made a fortune in the East Indies and whose heir was his nephew Sir John Perring, 1st Baronet (1765–1831) of Membland, senior partner of Perrings Bank and Lord Mayor of London in 1803. His bank failed in the Panic of 1825 after which he sold his estates. Membland and the manor of Revelstoke were purchased by a member of the Baring family, of whom Edward Baring was created in 1885 Baron Revelstoke of Membland.

== Arms ==
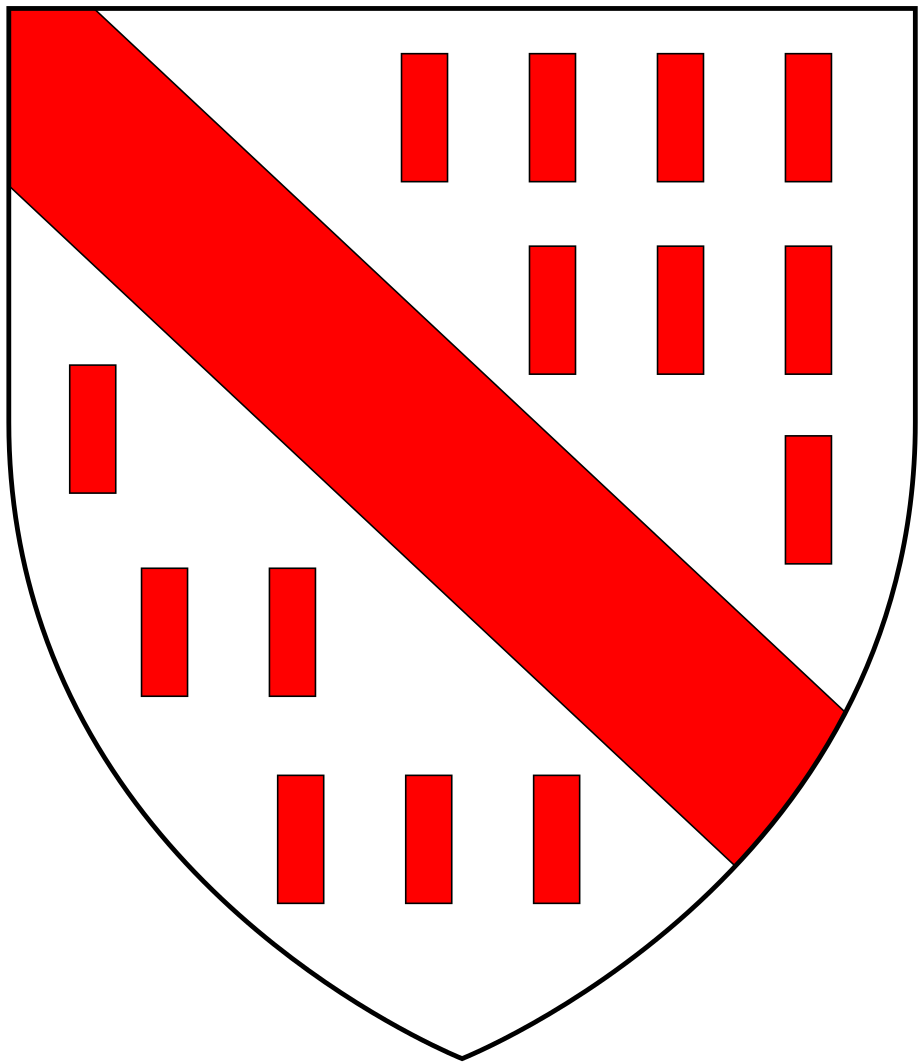
Arms of Bulteel: Argent biletée gules, a bend of the last

The arms of Bulteel of Fleet were described in Magna Britannia (1822) as: Arg. a bend between 14 billets, Gules with crest: Out of a ducal crown, G., a pair of wings, A., billetty of the first.

According to Thomas Robson the canting arms of Bulteel (of Somerset) are: Azure, three bull's heads couped argent, with crest: A bull's head gules between two wings or. The Bull and Bear Lodge at Membland has gate piers showing those heraldic beasts, supposedly a reference to the families of Bulteel and Baring, whose arms feature a bear. These are said to refer to the two principal types of allegorical beasts denoting stock market speculators, the bull and bear.
