= 1931 in music =

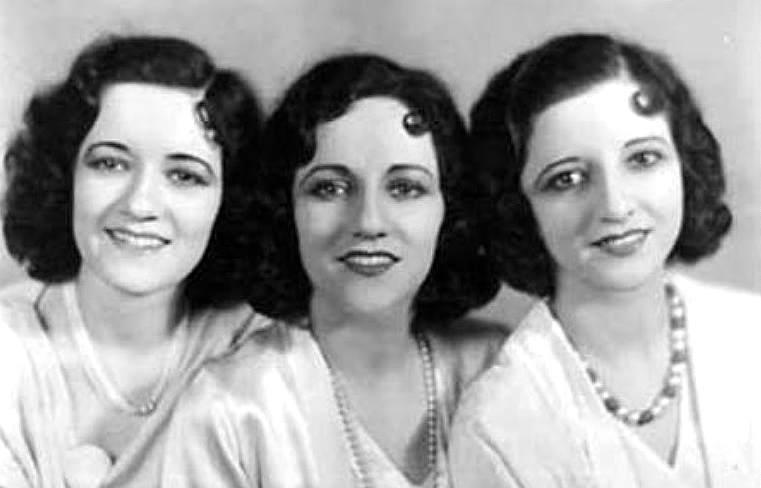
Boswell Sisters

This is a list of notable events in music that took place in 1931.

== Specific locations ==
- 1931 in British music
- 1931 in Norwegian music

== Specific genres ==
- 1931 in country music
- 1931 in jazz

== Events ==
- January 6 - John Serry Sr. makes the first of several professional appearances as a soloist on the Italian radio station WOV in New York City.
- January 24
  - Mary Garden makes her last appearance with Chicago Opera, before retiring to her native Scotland.
  - The Romen Theatre opens as a studio in Moscow.
- May 14 – After conducting a concert in memory of Giuseppe Martucci in Bologna, Arturo Toscanini is attacked by a crowd for having refused to perform the fascist Italian national anthem on the program.
- May 21 – RCA Victor's first commercially issued 33 1/3 rpm record, "Salon Suite, No. 1" by The Victor Salon Orchestra, directed by Nathaniel Shilkret, is recorded.
- May 23 – Edward Elgar's Nursery Suite receives its premiere in a recording studio (Kingsway Hall, London).
- July 22–28 – The ninth annual ISCM Festival of Contemporary Music takes place in London and Oxford, with concerts of orchestral, choral and chamber music.
- October 20 – The Indian Music Circle, dedicated to the revival of Indian classical music, is inaugurated with a ceremony held in the Jinnah Memorial Hall, Bombay.

== Published popular music ==
- "All of Me" w.m. Seymour Simons & Gerald Marks
- "As Time Goes By" w.m. Herman Hupfeld
- "At Your Command" w.m. Harry Barris, Bing Crosby & Harry Tobias
- "Black Jazz" m. Gene Gifford
- "Blah, Blah, Blah" w. Ira Gershwin m. George Gershwin. Introduced by El Brendel in the film Delicious
- "Blues in My Heart" w. Irving Mills m. Benny Carter
- "Bend Down, Sister" w. Ballard MacDonald & David Silverstein m. Con Conrad. From the musical film Palmy Days.
- "Brighter Than The Sun" w. Anona Winn m. Ray Noble
- "Brother, Can You Spare a Dime?" w. E. Y. Harburg m. Jay Gorney
- "By The River Sainte Marie" w. Edgar Leslie m. Harry Warren
- "Close Your Eyes" D. Carter – H. M. Tennent
- "Come to Me" w. B. G. De Sylva & Lew Brown m. Ray Henderson
- "Concentratin' On You" w. Andy Razaf m. Fats Waller
- "Crosby, Columbo And Vallee" w. Al Dubin m. Joe Burke
- "Cuban Love Song" w.m. Dorothy Fields, Jimmy McHugh & Herbert Stothart, for the film "The Cuban Love Song", 1931
- "Dancing In The Dark" w. Howard Dietz m. Arthur Schwartz
- "Delishious" w. Ira Gershwin m. George Gershwin, for the film "Delishious", 1931
- "Doin' What I Please" w. Andy Razaf m. Thomas Waller
- "Don't Take My Boop-Oop-A-Doop Away" w. Sammy Timberg m. Samuel Lerner. Introduced by Mae Questel and Rudy Vallee in the Betty Boop animated short Musical Justice (1931)
- "Dream a Little Dream of Me" w. Gus Kahn m. Fabian Andre & Wilbur Schwandt
- "An Evening In Caroline" w.m. Walter Donaldson
- "Goodnight, Sweetheart" w.m. Ray Noble, James Campbell & Reg Connelly
- "Got A Date With An Angel" w. Clifford Grey & Sonny Miller m. Jack Waller & Joseph Tunbridge
- "Got the Bench, Got the Park" w.m. Al Sherman, Al Lewis & Fred Phillips
- "Green Eyes" w. (Eng) E. Rivera & Eddie Woods (Sp) Adolfo Utrero m. Nilo Menendez
- "Guilty" w. Gus Kahn m. Richard A. Whiting & Harry Akst
- "He Played His Ukulele As The Ship Went Down" w.m. Arthur Le Clerq
- "Heartaches" w. John Clenner m. Al Hoffman
- "Hello, My Lover, Goodbye" w. Edward Heyman m. John Green. Introduced by Frances Langford in the musical Here Goes the Bride
- "Help Yourself to Happiness" w.m. Mack Gordon, Harry Revel and Harry Richman. Introduced by Harry Richman in the revue Ziegfeld Follies of 1931
- "Hold My Hand" w. Douglas Furber m. Noel Gay
- "Hoops" w. Howard Dietz m. Arthur Schwartz
- "I Apologize" w.m. Al Hoffman, Al Goodhart & Ed Nelson
- "I Don't Know Why" w. Roy Turk m. Fred E. Ahlert
- "I Found A Million Dollar Baby (In A Five And Ten Cent Store)" w. Billy Rose & Mort Dixon m. Harry Warren
- "I Heard" w.m. Don Redman
- "I Love Louisa" w. Howard Dietz m. Arthur Schwartz
- "I Surrender, Dear" w. Gordon Clifford m. Harry Barris
- "If You Should Ever Need Me" w. Al Dubin m. Joe Burke
- "I'll Be Good Because Of You" w.m. Ray Noble & Alan Murray
- "I'm Crazy 'Bout My Baby" w. Alex Hill m. Fats Waller
- "I'm Gonna Get You" w.m. Gus Arnheim, Harry Tobias & Jules Lemare
- "I'm Thru with Love" w. Gus Kahn m. Matty Malneck & Fud Livingston
- "It isnae me" w. Sally Holmes m. Edward Elgar
- "It's the Darndest Thing" w. Dorothy Fields m. Jimmy McHugh
- "It's the Girl" w. Dave Oppenheim m. Abel Baer
- "I've Got Five Dollars" w. Lorenz Hart m. Richard Rodgers
- "Kicking The Gong Around" w. Ted Koehler m. Harold Arlen
- "A Lady Must Live" w. Lorenz Hart m. Richard Rodgers. Introduced by Jeanne Aubert in the musical America's Sweetheart
- "Lady Of Spain" w.m. Robert Hargreaves, Tolchard Evans, Stanley J. Damerell & Henry J. Tilsley
- "Lies" w. George E. Springer m. Harry Barris
- "Life Is Just A Bowl Of Cherries" w. B. G. De Sylva & Lew Brown m. Ray Henderson
- "Love Is Sweeping The Country" w. Ira Gershwin m. George Gershwin
- "Love Letters In The Sand" w. Nick Kenny & Charles Kenny m. J. Fred Coots
- "Lullaby Of The Leaves" w. Joe Young m. Bernice Petkere
- "Mad Dogs And Englishmen" w.m. Noël Coward
- "Mama Inez" w. (Eng) L. Wolfe Gilbert m. Eliseo Grenet
- "Maria, My Own" w. (Eng) L. Wolfe Gilbert m. Ernesto Lecuona
- "Marta" w. (Eng) L. Wolfe Gilbert m. Moises Simons
- "Mary (I'm in Love with You)" w.m. J. Fred Coots & Ozzie Nelson
- "Mausie" w. (Eng) Harry Graham m. Paul Abraham
- "Me!" w.m. Irving Berlin
- "My Song" w. Lew Brown m. Ray Henderson
- "Nevertheless" w. Bert Kalmar m. Harry Ruby
- "Now's The Time To Fall In Love" w.m. Al Sherman & Al Lewis
- "Of Thee I Sing" w. Ira Gershwin m. George Gershwin
- "Oh, Monah" w.m. Ted Weems & Joe "Country" Washburn
- "One More Time" w.m. B. G. DeSylva, Lew Brown, and Ray Henderson.
- "Ooh That Kiss" w. Mort Dixon & Joe Young m. Harry Warren
- "Out Of Nowhere" w. Edward Heyman m. John Green
- "Paradise" w. Nacio Herb Brown & Gordon Clifford m. Nacio Herb Brown
- "Penthouse Serenade (When We're Alone)" w.m. Will Jason & Val Burton
- "Pied Piper Of Hamelin" w.m. Noel Gay
- "Poor Pierrot" w. Otto Harbach m. Jerome Kern
- "Prisoner Of Love" w. Leo Robin m. Russ Columbo & Clarence Gaskill
- "River, Stay 'Way From My Door" w. Mort Dixon m. Harry Woods
- "Roll On, Mississippi, Roll On" w.m. James McCaffrey, Eugene West & Dave Ringle
- "Running Between The Raindrops" w. James Dyrenforth m. Carroll Gibbons
- "She Didn't Say Yes" w. Otto Harbach m. Jerome Kern. Introduced by Bettina Hall in the musical The Cat and the Fiddle.
- "Smile, Darn Ya, Smile" w. Charles O'Flynn & Jack Meskill m. Max Rich
- "Somebody from Somewhere" w. Ira Gershwin m. George Gershwin. Introduced by Janet Gaynor in the film Delicious
- "Sweet And Lovely" w.m. Gus Arnheim, Harry Tobias & Jules Lemare
- "Thanks To You" w. Grant Clarke m. Pete Wendling
- "That Silver Haired Daddy Of Mine" w.m. Jimmy Long & Gene Autry
- "That's My Desire" w. Carroll Loveday m. Helmy Kresa
- "This Is The Missus" w.m. Lew Brown & Ray Henderson
- "The Thrill Is Gone" w.m. Lew Brown & Ray Henderson
- "Till The Real Thing Comes Along" w.m. Mann Holiner, Alberta Nichols. Introduced by Ethel Waters in the Broadway revue Rhapsody in Black. (Not to be confused with the 1936 song "Until the Real Thing Comes Along," which is a related composition with a new melody by Saul Chaplin and new words by Sammy Cahn.)
- "Twentieth Century Blues" w.m. Noël Coward
- "Under the Bridges of Paris" w. (Fr) Jean Rodor, (Eng) Dorcas Cochran m. Vincent Scotto
- "Underneath The Arches" w.m. Reg Connelly & Bud Flanagan
- "Was I?" w. Charles Farrell m. Chick Endor from the revue Ziegfeld Follies Of 1931
- "We'll Be The Same" w. Lorenz Hart m. Richard Rodgers
- "Were You Sincere" w. Jack Meskill m. Vincent Rose
- "When I Take My Sugar To Tea" w.m. Sammy Fain, Irving Kahal & Pierre Norman Connor
- "When It's Sleepy Time Down South" w.m. Leon Rene, Otis Rene & Clarence Muse
- "When The Bloom Is On The Sage" w.m. Nat Vincent & Fred Howard Wright
- "When The Moon Comes Over The Mountain" w.m. Howard Johnson, Harry Woods & Kate Smith
- "When Your Lover Has Gone" w.m. E. A. Swan
- "When Yuba Plays The Rumba On The Tuba" w.m. Herman Hupfeld
- "Where The Blue Of The Night" w.m. Roy Turk, Bing Crosby & Fred E. Ahlert
- "Who Cares?" w. Ira Gershwin m. George Gershwin. Introduced by William Gaxton and Lois Moran in the musical Of Thee I Sing
- "Wrap Your Troubles In Dreams" w. Ted Koehler & Billy Moll m. Harry Barris
- "Yes, Yes, My Baby Said Yes, Yes" Cliff Friend, Con Conrad. Introduced by Eddie Cantor in the film Palmy Days
- "You Are My Heart's Delight" w. Harry Graham m. Franz Lehár Music 1923
- "You Can't Stop Me From Loving You" w. Mann Holiner m. Alberta Nichols
- "You Forgot Your Gloves" w. Edward Eliscu m. Ned Lehac. Introduced by Constance Carpenter and Carl Randall in the revue The Third Little Show
- "You Rascal You" w.m. Sam Theard
- "You Try Somebody Else" w. B. G. De Sylva & Lew Brown m. Ray Henderson
- "You're Blasé" w. Bruce Sievier m. Ord Hamilton
- "You're My Decline And Fall" George Posford
- "You're My Everything" w. Mort Dixon & Joe Young m. Harry Warren
- "Yours" (orig. "Quiéreme Mucho") w. (Eng) Jack Sherr (Sp) Augustin Rodriguez m. Gonzalo Roig

== Top Popular Recordings 1931 ==
After $75 million in sales during 1929, the US stock market crash in October nearly destroyed the industry, after forty years of consistent operation. Sales fell to $18 million in 1930 and then $5.5 million in 1931, where they remained for the next four years. The top selling records of 1929 ranged from $500,000 and up, fell under $100,000 in 1930, $60k in 1931 and $20k in 1932, where they stayed for several years. Keep this in mind when reviewing sales figures. You may also notice less artists and records. Record companies were afraid of taking more losses, such as gambling on new artists and new styles. Guy Lombardo's recording schedule was unaffected because his releases always sold well, but there were few new acts. Most of the records released in 1931 came from Radio Corporation of America (Victor), Columbia/Okeh, Brunswick (now owned by Warner Brothers Studios) and American Record Corporation (ARC), which featured discounted "dime store" labels.

The top popular records of 1931 listed below were compiled from Joel Whitburn's Pop Memories 1890–1954, record sales reported on the "Discography of American Historical Recordings" website, and other sources as specified. Numerical rankings are approximate, there were no Billboard charts in 1931, the numbers are only used for a frame of reference.

Rank	Artist	Title	Label	Recorded	Released	Chart Positions
1	Wayne King and His Orchestra (vocal Ernie Birchill)	"Good-night Sweetheart"	Victor 22825	September 29, 1931	October 1931	US Billboard 1931 #1, US #1 for 7 weeks, 15 total weeks
2	Duke Ellington and His Cotton Club Orchestra	"Mood Indigo"	Victor 22587	December 10, 1930	January 23, 1931	US Billboard 1931 #2, US #3 for 10 total weeks, 48,191 sales, Grammy Hall of Fame in 1975
3	Gus Arnheim Coconut Grove Orchestra (vocal Donald Novis)	"Sweet And Lovely"	Victor 22770	July 19, 1931	August 1931	US Billboard 1931 #3, US #1 for 6 weeks, 14 total weeks, 20,527 sales
4	Mills Brothers	"Tiger Rag"	Brunswick 6197	October 9, 1931	November 1931	US Billboard 1931 #4, US #1 for 4 weeks, 13 total weeks
5	Wayne King and His Orchestra	"Dream a Little Dream of Me"	Victor 22643	February 18, 1931	March 1931	US Billboard 1931 #5, US #1 for 4 weeks, 12 total weeks, 30,755 sales, ASCAP song of 1930
6	Bing Crosby	"Just One More Chance"	Brunswick 6120	May 4, 1931	May 1931	US Billboard 1931 #6, US #1 for 2 weeks, 19 total weeks
7	Guy Lombardo and His Royal Canadians	"By the River St. Marie"	Columbia 2401-D	February 10, 1931	March 1931	US Billboard 1931 #7, US #1 for 3 weeks, 11 total weeks
8	Bing Crosby	"At Your Command"	Brunswick 6145	June 24, 1931	July 1931	US Billboard 1931 #8, US #1 for 3 weeks, 9 total weeks
9	Kate Smith with Ben Selvin and His Orchestra	"When the Moon Comes Over the Mountain"	Columbia 2516-D	August 17, 1931	September 1931	US Billboard 1931 #9, US #1 for 2 weeks, 14 total weeks
10	Gus Arnheim Coconut Grove Orchestra (vocal Bing Crosby)	"I Surrender Dear"	Victor 22618	January 19, 1931	March 1931	US Billboard 1931 #10, US #3 for 3 weeks, 10 total weeks
11	Leo Reisman and His Orchestra (vocal Ben W. Gordon)	"Just a Gigolo"	Victor 22606	January 5, 1931	March 1931	US Billboard 1931 #11, US #15 for 1 weeks, 2 total weeks, 39,618 sales
12	Bud Billings (Frank Luther) and Carson Robison	"When Your Hair Has Turned To Silver"	Victor 22588	November 26, 1930	January 23, 1931	US Billboard 1931 #12, US #4 for 1 week, 12 total weeks, US Hillbilly 1931 #3, 38,805 sales
13	Wayne King and His Orchestra	"The Waltz You Saved for Me"	Victor 22575	November 7, 1930	April 1931	US Billboard 1931 #13, US #4 for 1 week, 15 total weeks, 38,450 sales
14	Bing Crosby	"Out of Nowhere"	Brunswick 6090	March 30, 1931	April 1931	US Billboard 1931 #14, US #1 for 3 weeks, 8 total weeks
15	Guy Lombardo and His Royal Canadians	"(There Ought to Be a) Moonlight Saving Time"	Columbia 2457-D	April 29, 1931	May 1931	US Billboard 1931 #15, US #1 for 3 weeks, 8 total weeks
16	Cab Calloway and His Orchestra	"Minnie the Moocher"	Brunswick 6074	March 3, 1931	March 1931	US Billboard 1931 #16, US #1 for 1 week, 17 total weeks
17	Fred Waring's Pennsylvanians	"Love For Sale"	Victor 22598	December 24, 1930	March 1931	US Billboard 1931 #17, US #14 for 1 week, 2 total weeks, 34,465 sales
18	Fred Waring's Pennsylvanians	"I Found a Million Dollar Baby (in a Five and Ten Cent Store)"	Victor 22707	May 4, 1931	June 1931	US Billboard 1931 #18, US #1 for 3 weeks, 6 total weeks, 20,769 sales
19	Bing Crosby	"I Found a Million Dollar Baby (in a Five and Ten Cent Store)"	Brunswick 6140	May 4, 1931	June 1931	US Billboard 1931 #19, US #1 for 3 weeks, 6 total weeks
20	Gus Arnheim Coconut Grove Orchestra (vocals Rhythm Boys)	"The Little Things In Life"	Victor 22580	November 25, 1930	December 1930	US Billboard 1931 #20, US #4 for 1 week, 5 total weeks, 29,066 sales
21	Rudy Vallee and His Connecticut Yankees	"Would You Like to Take a Walk?"	Victor 22611	January 13, 1931	April 1931	US Billboard 1931 #21, US #4 for 1 week, 7 total weeks, 32,716 sales
22	Wayne King and His Orchestra	"Goofus"	Victor 22600	November 6, 1930	January 1931	US Billboard 1931 #22, US #4 for 1 week, 15 total weeks, 38,450 sales
23	Guy Lombardo and His Royal Canadians	"Good Night, Sweetheart"	Columbia 2547-D	October 8, 1931	November 1931	US Billboard 1931 #23, US #1 for 2 weeks, 11 total weeks
24	Rudy Vallee and His Connecticut Yankees	"When Yuba Plays the Rhumba on the Tuba"	Victor 22742	June 15, 1931	August 1931	US Billboard 1931 #24, US #2 for 1 week, 7 total weeks, 27,402 sales
25	Fred Waring's Pennsylvanians	"Dancing in the Dark"	Victor 22708	May 18, 1931	July 1931	US Billboard 1931 #25, US #3 for 1 week, 11 total weeks, 26,928 sales
26	Ted Lewis and His Band	"Just a Gigolo"	Columbia 2378-D	January 13, 1931	February 1931	US Billboard 1931 #26, US #1 for 2 weeks, 8 total weeks

== Top Blues Recordings ==
- "Devil Got My Woman" – Skip James
- "Hard Time Killin' Floor Blues" – Skip James
- "I'm So Glad" – Skip James
- "Uncle Ned, Don't Use Your Head" – Lonnie Johnson
- "Southern Can is Mine" – Blind Willie McTell
- "Broke Down Engine Blues" – Blind Willie McTell
- "Georgia Rag" – Blind Willie McTell

== Classical music ==
- Jean Absil – Trio for violin, cello, and piano, op. 7
- Joseph Achron – Quartet for Cello, Trumpet, Horn, and Piano, Golem
- Jehan Alain
  - Dans le rêve laissé par la ballade des pendus de Villon, for piano
  - En dévissant mes chaussettes, for piano
  - Heureusement, la bonne fé sa marraine y mit bon ordre, for piano
  - Histoire dur des tapis, entre des murs blancs, for piano
  - Lumière qui tombe d'un vasistas, for piano
  - Mélodie-sandwich, for piano
  - Nocturne, for piano
  - Petite rhapsodie, for piano
  - Verset-choral, for piano
  - 26 septembre, 1931, for piano
- Karel Albert – Oedipus a Colonus, incidental music for the play by Sophocles
- Franco Alfano
  - Due intermezzi, for strings
  - Vesuvius (Hic est illa Napolis), ballet, for orchestra
- Hugo Alfvén – Swedish Rhapsody No. 3 (Dalarapsodien), for orchestra, op. 47
- Hendrik Andriessen
  - Hymnus "Te Joseph celebrent", for soprano, baritone, and organ
  - Missa pro defunctis, for three voices and organ
  - "O quam suavis est", for two voices and organ
  - Sonata No. 2, for violin and piano
- George Antheil – Six Little Pieces, for string quartet
- Hans Erich Apostel – Fünf Lieder, for low voice and piano or orchestra, op. 3
- Dina Appeldoorn – Zes kantoj
- Blaž Arnič – Concerto for Organ and Percussion
- Kurt Atterberg – Suite No. 8, for orchestra (Suite pastorale in modo antico), op. 34
- Georges Auric
  - À nous la liberté (music for the film by René Clair),
  - La concurrence (ballet)
  - Le quatorze juillet (incidental music for the play by Romain Rolland)
- Daniel Ayala
  - Radiogramma, for piano
  - Uchben X'coholte, for soprano and chamber orchestra
- Grażyna Bacewicz – Suite, for string orchestra
- Henk Badings
  - Sextet, for alto voice, flute, clarinet, violin, viola, and piano
  - Sonata, for violin and piano [unnumbered, precedes Sonata No. 1]
  - String Quartet No. 1
- Samuel Barber
  - Dover Beach, for mezzo-soprano or baritone and string quartet, op. 3
  - Pieces for Carillon: Round, Allegro, Legend
  - The School for Scandal (overture), for orchestra, op. 5
- Béla Bartók
  - Duos (Forty-four), for two violins
  - Hungarian Sketches, for orchestra
  - Piano Concerto No. 2
  - Transylvanian Dances, for orchestra
- Marion Bauer – "Here at High Morning", for male chorus, op. 27
- Arnold Bax
  - Northern Ballad No. 1, for orchestra
  - Red Autumn, for piano duo
  - Symphony No. 4
  - The Tale the Pine-Trees Knew, for orchestra
  - Valse, for harp
- Amy Beach
  - "Christ in the universe", for alto, tenor, four-part choir, and orchestra, or organ, op. 132
  - "Juni", for four-part choir and piano (also version for three-part female choir), op. 51, no. 3
  - Prelude, for violin, cello, and piano
  - Sea Fever and The Last Prayer, for four-part male choir and piano, op. 126, nos. 1 and 2
  - "When the last sea is sailed", for four-part male choir and piano, op. 127
- Paul Ben-Haim
  - Concerto Grosso, for orchestra
  - Entrückung, for baritone and piano
  - Pan, symphonic poem for soprano and orchestra
- Lennox Berkeley
  - La poulette grise, for two children's choirs, trumpet, and two pianos
  - Sonata No.1, for violin and piano
- Boris Blacher
  - Concerto, for two trumpets and string orchestra
  - Concert Overture, for orchestra
  - Fünf Sinnsprüche Omars des Zeltmachers, for mezzo-soprano or baritone and piano, op. 3
  - Toccatas (two), for piano
  - Trio, for violin, viola, and cello
  - Zwei estnische Nationaltänze, for piano (later destroyed)
- Marc Blitzstein – Piano Concerto
- Paul Bowles
  - In the Platinum Forest, for medium voice and piano
  - Sonata, for oboe and clarinet
  - Tamanar, for piano
- Luis de Freitas Branco – Lembrança, for four-part male choir
- Havergal Brian –
  - The Battle Song, symphonic poem for brass band
  - Symphony No. 2 in E minor
- Frank Bridge – Phantasm, for piano and orchestra
- Benjamin Britten
  - Christ's Nativity, Christmas Suite, for SATB choir
  - Fugue in A major, for piano
  - Plymouth Town, ballet, for orchestra
  - Rhapsodies, for violin, viola, and piano
  - String Quartet in D
  - Tit for Tat , for voice and piano
  - Twelve Variations, for piano
- Willy Burkhard
  - Fantasie, for organ, op. 32
  - Kleine Stücke, for piano, op. 31
  - Te Deum, for two-voice chorus, trumpet, trombone, timpani, and organ, op. 33
  - Vierundzwanzig Melodien aus den Hassler'schen Choralgesängen, for four-voice choir, op. 30
- John Alden Carpenter – Song of Faith, for SATB choir and orchestra
- Julián Carrillo
  - Estudio (A media noche en oriental), for 1/4-tone guitar
  - Estudios, for 1/3-tone arpa-citara
  - Preludios, for mictotonal arpa-citara
  - Sonata "Amanecer en Berlin 13", for 1/4-tone arpa-citara
  - Symphony No. 3 "Colombia"
- Elliott Carter – Philoctetes (incidental music for the play by Sophocles), for tenor, baritone, male chorus, oboe, and percussion
- Alfredo Casella
  - La donna serpente, Suite No. 1, op. 50 bis
  - La donna serpente, Suite No. 2, op. 50 ter
- Mario Castelnuovo-Tedesco
  - Ballade des biens immeubles, for voice and piano, op. 68
  - Concerto "I profeti", for violin and orchestra, op. 66
  - The Lark, for violin and piano, op. 64
  - Mi–la, for piano
  - Film Studies (Two), for piano, op. 67
- Juan José Castro – Symphony No. 1
- Abram Chasins – Parade, for orchestra
- Francesco Cilea – Suite No. 2, for orchestra
- Philip Greeley Clapp
  - A Highly Academic Diversion on Seven Notes, for orchestra
  - Symphony No. 9 in E♭ major (The Pioneers)
- Arnold Cooke – Passacaglia, Scherzo, and Finale, for flute, oboe, clarinet, bassoon, and string quartet
- Aaron Copland – Miracle at Verdun, incidental music for the play by Hans Chlumberg, chamber orchestra
- Henry Cowell
  - 479 [Gig], for piano
  - Competitive Sport, for piano
  - Heroic Dance, for ten instruments
  - "How Old Is Song?", for voice and piano
  - Rhythmicana, for rhythmicon and orchestra
  - Steel and Stone, original version, for piano?
- Jean Cras – Concerto for Piano and Orchestra
- Ruth Crawford Seeger – String Quartet
- Nancy Dalberg – Tre danske Duetter, for voices
- Georges Dandelot – Chansons de Bilitis, for voice and piano, second set
- Johann Nepomuk David – Kleine Präludien und Fugen, in A minor and G major, for organ
- Maurice Delage – Deux fables de Jean de La Fontaine, for voice, flute, oboe, two clarinets, bassoon, horn, trumpet, piano, and string quartet
- Frederick Delius
  - Fantastic Dance, for orchestra
  - Irmelin Prelude, for orchestra
- Marcel Dupré
  - Chorales (79), for organ, op. 28
  - Pieces (Seven), for organ, op. 27
- Vernon Duke
  - Ballade, for piano and chamber orchestra
  - Printemps, for piano
- George Dyson – The Canterbury Pilgrims (G. Chaucer), for soprano, tenor, baritone, choir, and orchestra
- Sophie Carmen Eckhardt-Gramatté
  - Piano Concerto No. 1 (revised version)
  - Grave funèbre, for violin and chamber orchestra
- Werner Egk
  - Blasmusik No. 1, for wind orchestra
  - Blasmusik No. 2, for wind orchestra
  - Furchtlosigkeit und Wohlwollen, oratorio for tenor, mixed chorus, and orchestra
  - Musica per banda, for wind orchestra
- Hanns Eisler
  - Lied der roten Flieger, for voice and small orchestra or piano
  - Das Lied vom vierten Mann, for voice and small orchestra or piano
  - Die Mutter, for choir and orchestra, op. 25
  - Songs (Four) from the film Niemandsland
  - Songs (Three) from the film Kuhle Wampe, oder Wem gehört die Welt?, op. 27
  - Songs (Three) from the film Das Lied vom Leben, op. 36
  - Streiklied, for voice and small orchestra or piano
  - Suite No. 2, for orchestra, (from the film Niemandsland), op. 24
  - Suite No. 3, for orchestra (from the film Kuhle Wampe), op. 26
- Edward Elgar
  - Nursery Suite, for orchestra
  - Soliloquy, for oboe and orchestra
- Heino Eller
  - Elegy, for harp and string orchestra
  - String Quartet No. 2
- Ulvi Cemal Erkin – Beş damla, for piano
- Ferenc Farkas
  - Alla danza ungherese, for orchestra
  - Canephorae, five pieces for piano or organ
  - Passacaglia, for organ
  - Pastorali, for voice and piano or chamber orchestra
  - Quaderno Romano, six pieces for piano
  - Sonatina No. 2, for violin and piano
- Samuel Feinberg – Piano Concerto No. 1
- Jacobo Ficher – Sonata, for flute, viola, and piano, op. 18
- Gerald Finzi – To Joy, for voice and piano, op. 13
- Wolfgang Fortner
  - Grenzen der Menschheit, for baritone, five-part choir, and orchestra
  - Lied der Welt, for male choir
- Isadore Freed – String Quartet
- Noël Gallon – Sonatine, for piano
- Alejandro García Caturla
  - El caballo blanco, for four-part mixed choir
  - Rumba, for chamber orchestra
  - Suite cubana No. 1, for chamber orchestra (also chamber version for flute, oboe, cor anglais, clarinet, bass clarinet, bassoon, horn, piano, and timpani)
  - Yamba-O, for orchestra
- Luiz Cosme
  - Acalanto, for soprano and piano
  - Aquela china, for voice and piano
  - Balada para os carreteiros, for baritone and piano
  - Mãe d'agua canta, for violin and piano, or for string quartet
- Roberto Gerhard – Sis cançons populars catalanes, for soprano or tenor and orchestra
- George Gershwin – Second Rhapsody, for piano and orchestra
- Vittorio Giannini
  - Madrigal, for four solo voice and string quartet
  - Quintet, for two violins, viola, cello, and piano
  - Suite, for orchestra
  - Trio, for violin, cello, and piano
- Cecil Armstrong Gibbs
  - The Flooded Stream, for voice and piano
  - The Orchard Sings to the Child, for voice and piano
  - Padraic the Fidiler, for voice and piano, with violin ad libitum
  - Pieces (two), for clarinet and piano
- Alexander Glazunov – "Concerto ballata" in C major, for cello and orchestra, op. 108
- Reinhold Glière – Comedians (ballet)
- Radamés Gnattali
  - Para meu Rancho, for voice and piano
  - Poemas (Tres), for voice and piano
  - Rapsódia brasileira, for piano
- Leopold Godowsky
  - Capriccio, for piano left-hand
  - Etude (paraphrase of Adolf Henselt), in F♯ major, for piano, op. 2 no. 6
- Berthold Goldschmidt
  - Die Herde sucht (incidental music)
  - Zwei Betrachtungen (later retitled Letzte Kapitel), for speaker, chamber choir, piano, and percussion, op. 15
- Eugene Aynsley Goossens –

Autumn Crocus (incidental music)
Songs (Two), op. 49
Songs (Four), op. 53

- Percy Grainger –

Lisbon (Dublin Bay) (second setting)
Tribute to Foster

- Alexander Gretchaninov – Sonata, for piano, op. 129
- Ferde Grofé –
  - Grand Canyon Suite, for orchestra
  - Knute Rockne, symphonic poem for orchestra
- Camargo Guarnieri
  - Piano Concerto No. 1
  - Poemas de Macunaíma, for voice and orchestra
  - Cello Sonata No. 1
  - Trio for violin, viola, and cello
- Alois Hába
  - Fantazie No. 1, for nonet, op. 40
  - Toccata quasi una fantasia, for piano, op. 38
- Henry Hadley
  - Aurora Borealis, overture for orchestra
  - San Francisco, suite for orchestra in C major, op. 121
  - Youth Triumphant, overture for band
- Johan Halvorsen – Danses norvégiennes Nos. 3–6, for violin and orchestra [originally with piano accompaniment, 1930]
- Roy Harris
  - American Portrait (revised version)
  - Andantino, for orchestra
  - Concert Piece, for orchestra
  - Toccata, for orchestra
- Karl Amadeus Hartmann
  - Sonatina, for piano
  - Tanzsuite, for wind quintet
- Alfred Hill – Mass in E♭ major
- Paul Hindemith
  - Duette, for two violins
  - Einige Klavierstücke, for piano
  - Fünf-und-Vierzig Stücke, for 1 and 2 violins
  - Konzertstück, for trautonium and strings
  - Musik zu einem abstrakten Fischinger-Film, for string trio
  - Musik zu einen Trickfilm, for piano
  - Reklamefilm Clermont de Fouet, for string trio
  - Spiel- und Hörschule
  - "Der Tod", for TTBB choir
  - Das Unaufhörliche (oratorio), for soprano, tenor, baritone, bass, mixed choir, children's choir, orchestra, and organ
- Vagn Holmboe
  - Allegro affettuoso, for piano
  - Allegro sostenuto, for violin and piano
  - Chamber Music No. 1, for chamber orchestra
  - Choral Pieces, for children's chorus
  - Concerto for chamber orchestra
  - Concerto, for solo piano
  - Duets, for two recorders
  - Provinsen [The Provinces], for soprano, alto, tenor, baritone, choir, flute, oboe, violin, and cello
  - Requiem, for children's voices, children's chorus, and chamber orchestra
- Gustav Holst – Twelve Welsh Folk Songs, for choir, H183
- Arthur Honegger – Cris du monde (oratorio), for solo voices, children's chorus, mixed chorus, and orchestra
- Alan Hovhaness – Boreas and Mount Wildcat, for orchestra op. 2a
- Mary Howe
  - Dirge, for orchestra
  - Der Einsame, for voice and piano
  - Liebeslied, for voice and piano
  - Mailied, for voice and piano
  - Schlaflied, for voice and piano
  - Suite mélancolique, for violin, cello, and piano
  - Whimsy, for piano
- Herbert Howells
  - "Delicates so dainty", unison voices and piano
  - "A Maid Peerless", for SSAA choir and orchestra
  - Severn, for SATB choir
  - "Sweet Content", for unison voices and piano
  - Three Folksongs, for voice and piano
- Jacques Ibert
  - Les cinq gentlemen maudits, music for the film by J. Duvivier
  - S.O.S. Foch, music for the film by J. Arroy
  - Symphonie marine, for orchestra
- Vincent d'Indy
  - Chanson en forme de canon à l'octave, for soprano and baritone, op. 102
  - Chant de nourrice, for three equal voices, op. 103
  - Cinq chansons folkloriques et deux rigaudons à une voix, for voice and piano
  - Le forgeron, for three-part choir and string quartet, op. 104
  - String Quartet No. 4 (unfinished)
  - La vengeance du mari, soprano, two tenors, four-part choit, small wind band or piano, op. 105
- John Ireland – Songs Sacred and Profane, for voice and piano
- Charles Ives – The Fourth of July, from A Symphony: New England Holidays (revised version)
- Gordon Jacob
  - Passacaglia on a Well-Known Theme, for orchestra
  - Songs (Three), for soprano and clarinet
- Dorothy James – Symphonic Fragments (Three), for orchestra
- André Jolivet
  - Études (Six), for piano
  - Mélodies sur des poésies anciennes (Quatre), for voice and piano or chamber orchestra
  - Prière des 13 hommes dans la mine, for baritone or mezzo-soprano and piano
  - Rondels de François Villon (Trois), for voice and piano
  - Suite, for viola and piano
- Joseph Jongen
  - Pièces en trio, for violin, cello, and piano, op. 95,
  - String Quartet No. 5, op. 95
- Manolis Kalomiris – Symphony No. 2 "Of the Good and Simple People", for choir and orchestra
- Edvin Kallstenius – Dalarapsodi (1st Swedish rhapsody)
- Sigfrid Karg-Elert
  - Music for Organ, op. 145
  - Passacaglia and Fugue on BACH, op. 150
  - Sempre semplice, for organ, op. 142, no. 2
- Albert Ketèlbey – In the Mystic Land of Egypt
- Aram Khachaturian – Double Fugue, for string quartet
- Uuno Klami
  - Hommage à Haendel, for orchestra
  - Scenes from a Puppet Theatre, for orchestra
  - Rag-Time and Blues, for two violins, clarinet, trumpet, and piano
  - Cheremis Fantasia, for cello and orchestra
- Lev Knipper – Little Negro Sebi, ballet for orchestra, op. 24
- Zoltán Kodály
  - Mátrai képek, for mixed choir
  - Nagyszalontai köszöntő, for mixed choir or treble choir
  - Prelude, for organ
- Erich Wolfgang Korngold – Piano Sonata No. 3 in C major, op. 25
- Charles Koechlin
  - Chorals (22), op. 117
  - Chorals dans les modes du moyen-âge (Cinq), for orchestra, op. 117bis
- Ernst Krenek
  - Bagatelles (Four), for piano four-hands, op. 70
  - Durch die Nacht, song cycle, for soprano and orchestra, op. 67a
  - Die Nachtigall, concert aria, for coloratura soprano and orchestra, op. 68a
  - Gesänge des späten Jahres, for voice and piano, op. 71
  - Theme and Thirteen Variations, for orchestra, op. 69
- Paul Ladmirault – En Fôret
- László Lajtha – Violin Concerto, op. 15
- Constant Lambert
  - Concerto for Piano & 9 Instruments
  - Salome (incidental music for the play by Oscar Wilde), for clarinet, trumpet, cello, and percussion
- Lars-Erik Larsson – Duo, for violin and viola, op. 6
- Marc Lavry – Jewish Suite, for string quartet
- Jón Leifs
  - Íslendingaljóð [Poems of Icelanders], for male choir, op. 15a
  - Íslenskir söngdansar [Icelandic Dance-Songs], for voices with ad lib instrumental accompaniment, op. 17a
  - Ný rímnadanslög [New Icelandic Dances], for piano, op. 14b
  - Preludes (Three), for organ, op. 16
  - Sjávarvísur [Ocean Verses], for male choir, op. 15b
- George Frederick McKay – Trio, for violin, cello, and piano
- Alexander Mackenzie – Partsongs (Two), for four-part mixed choir and piano, op. 92
- Elizabeth Maconchy
  - A Hymn to Christ, A Hymn to God the Father, for double choir
  - The Leaden Echo and the Golden Echo, for choir and orchestra
  - The Willow Plate (dramatic work in three parts, unfinished)
- Gian Francesco Malipiero
  - Concerti, for orchestra
  - Epitaffio, for piano
  - String Quartet No. 3 "Cantari alla madrigalesca"
- Igor Markevitch – Serenade for Three Instruments
- Frank Martin – La nique à Satan (spectacle populaire), for baritone, children's choir, female choir, male choir, wind instruments, 2 pianos, percussion, and contrabass
- Bohuslav Martinů
  - Borova, for oboe, clarinet, trumpet, piano, and strings
  - Concerto for String Quartet and Orchestra
  - Doux esquisses, for piano
  - Jeux, for piano
  - Partita (Suite No. 1), for string orchestra
  - Sept études rhythmiques, for violin and piano
  - Seven Arabesques, for violin and piano
  - Slavnostní ouvertura k sokolskému sletu, for orchestra
  - Sonata No. 2, for violin and piano
  - "Staročeská říkadla", for women's choir
  - Untitled Pieces (four), for piano
- Nikolai Medtner
  - Leichte Klavierstücke (Zwei), in B♯ major and A minor, for piano
  - Sonata minacciosa in F minor, for piano, op. 53, no. 2
- Erkki Melartin
  - Festliches Präludium, for organ
  - Höstkvällen, for voice and piano, op. 170, no. 2
  - Hvarje årstid, for voice and piano, op. 171
  - Långt från land, for voice and piano
  - Lohdutus [Consolation], for chamber orchestra, op. 168
  - Muistathan [Do you remember?], for voice and piano (composed under the pseudonym Eero Mela)
  - Runebergsånger, for voice and piano, op. 172
  - Sånger till ord av Jarl Hemmer, for voice and piano, op. 162
  - Sonata, for flute and harp, op. 135b
  - Sonatina No. 2, for piano, op. 135a
  - Törnet, for voice and piano, op. 170, no. 3
- Olivier Messiaen
  - L'ensorceleuse, cantata for soprano, tenor, bass, and piano or orchestra
  - Fugue sur un sujet de Georges Hüe, for four unspecified instruments
  - Le tombeau resplendissant, for orchestra
- Darius Milhaud – Sonata for organ, op. 112
- Ernest John Moeran
  - Suffolk Folksongs (Six), for voice and piano
  - Trio, for violin, viola, and cello
  - Whythorne's Shadow, for orchestra
- Federico Mompou – Comptines I–III, for voice and piano
- Carl Nielsen
  - Allegretto, in F major, for two recorders
  - Commotio, for organ, op. 50
  - "Det som lysner over vangen", for voice and piano
  - Klaverstykke, for piano
  - "Kvadet om Nordens harpe", for TTBB choir
  - Ligbraendings–Kantate, for choir and orchestra
  - Paaske-aften (incidental music)
- Gösta Nystroem – Sinfonia breve (Symphony No. 1)
- Carl Orff
  - Cantata (Werkbuch II), for choir, piano, and percussion
  - Catulli Carmina II, for choir
- Leo Ornstein – Preludes (Six), for cello and piano
- Paul Paray – Mass for the 500th Anniversary of the Death of Joan of Arc
- Harry Partch
  - "By the Waters of Babylon", for voice and adapted viola
  - Potion Scene from Romeo and Juliet (Shakespeare), for voice and adapted viola
- Juan Carlos Paz
  - Suite for Emperor and Galilean by Henrik Ibsen, for orchestra
  - Pieces (Three), for orchestra
  - Sonata, for violin and piano
- Wilhelm Peterson-Berger
  - Danslek ur Ran [Dance Game from Ran], for choir a capella or choir and piano
  - Jämtlandssången [Song of Jämtland], for unison choir and piano
- Hans Pfitzner
  - Lieder (Sechs), for voice and piano, op. 40
  - Sonette (Drei), op. 41
- Willem Pijper – Sonata, for unaccompanied violin
- Mario Pilati
  - Canzoni popolari italiane (Quattro), for small orchestra
  - String Quartet in A major
- Walter Piston – Suite, for oboe and piano
- Ildebrando Pizzetti – Introduzione all'Agamennone, for choir and orchestra
- Quincy Porter
  - Songs for Helen on Nursery Rhymes (Twelve), for voice and piano
  - String Quartet No. 4
- Francis Poulenc
  - Cinq poèmes de Max Jacob, for voice and piano
  - Concertino, for piano four hands
  - Quatre poèmes de Guillaume Apollinaire, for voice and piano
  - Sonata for Violin and Piano
  - Trois poèmes de Louise Lalanne, for voice and piano
- Sergei Prokofiev – Piano Concerto No. 4, for left hand, written for Paul Wittgenstein
- Sergei Rachmaninoff
  - Piano Sonata No. 2 in B♭ minor, op. 36 (revised version)
  - Variations on a Theme of Corelli, for piano, op. 42
- Maurice Ravel – Piano Concerto in G
- Ottorino Respighi
  - Antiche danze ed arie per liuto, Suite No. 3, for string quartet
  - Belkis, regina di Saba (ballet), for orchestra
  - Maria egiziaca (trittico da concerto), for voices and orchestra
- Silvestre Revueltas
  - Duo para pato y canario, for voice and small orchestra
  - Esquinas, for orchestra with soprano voice
  - "Ranas", for voice and piano
  - "El tecolote", for voice and piano
  - String Quartet No. 2
  - String Quartet No. 3
  - Ventanas, for orchestra
- Wallingford Riegger
  - Canons for Woodwinds (Three), for flute, oboe, clarinet, bassoon, op. 9
  - Fantasy and Fugue, for orchestra and organ, op. 10
- Vittorio Rieti
  - Preludes (Three), for piano
  - Serenata, for violin and eleven instruments or chamber orchestra
  - Symphony No. 2
- Joaquín Rodrigo – Serenata española, for piano
- Amadeo Roldán
  - Tres toques, for orchestra
  - Curujey, son for choir, two pianos, and two percussionists
- Guy Ropartz – L'indiscret, ballet, for orchestra
- Hilding Rosenberg
  - Female Choruses (Two)
  - Medea, incidental music for the play by Euripides
  - Song of Mourning and Pastoral (from the incidental music for Medea), female choir and piano
- Albert Roussel
  - A Flower Given to my Daughter, for voice and piano
  - Idylles (Deux), for voice and piano, op. 44
  - Sonata No. 1, for violin and piano, in D minor, op. 11 (revised version)
- Carl Ruggles – Sun-Treader, for orchestra
- Harald Sæverud
  - Suite, for piano, op. 6
  - Variazioni piccole (50), for orchestra, op. 8
- Andrés Sas
  - Aire de siembra, for orchestra
  - Canciones románticas peruanas, for voice and piano, no. 1: "Arrullo de muñeca", op. 17, no. 1
  - Canciones simbólicas (Tres), for voice and piano, op. 14
  - Kcachampa, for orchestra
  - Prelude, for string quartet, op. 15
  - Suite peruana, for piano, op. 16
- Henri Sauguet
  - Divertissement de chambre, for flute, clarinet, bassoon, viola, and piano
  - Polymètres, for voice and piano
- Franz Schmidt – Variationen über ein Husarenlied, for orchestra
- Florent Schmitt
  - Choeurs (six), for four-part women's choir, a capella or with orchestra, op. 81
  - Symphonie concertante, for piano and orchestra, op. 82
- Othmar Schoeck – Sonata in E major, for violin and piano, op. 46
- Arnold Schoenberg
  - Four-part Mirror Canon
  - Klavierstück, op. 33b
  - Mirror Canon, for string quartet
  - Two-part Mirror Canon for Herrmann Abraham "Spiegle Dich im Werk"
- Erwin Schulhoff – Suite dansante en jazz, for piano
- Cyril Scott
  - Cello Concerto
  - Trio No. 1, for violin, viola, and cello
  - Trio No. 2, for violin, viola, and cello
- Roger Sessions – Waltzes, for orchestra (lost)
- Kaikhosru Shapurji Sorabji
  - Movement for Voice and Piano
  - Piano Symphony No. 0
- Vissarion Shebalin – Lenin, dramatic symphony for narrator, four vocal soloists, choir, and orchestra, op. 16
- Nikos Skalkottas
  - "O ti thel ē mana sou?" [Oh What Does Your Mother Want?], for voice and piano
  - Octet, for flute, oboe, clarinet, bassoon, two violins, viola, and cello
  - Piano Concerto No. 1
- Yngve Sköld – Alla Leggenda
- Richard Strauss – Kampf und Sieg, for orchestra
- Igor Stravinsky – Violin Concerto in D
- Josef Suk – Mass in B♭ major, for SATB choir, strings, organ, and timpani (revised version)
- Karol Szymanowski – Harnasie (ballet-pantomime), op. 55
- Alexandre Tansman
  - Concertino, for piano and orchestra
  - Danses polonaises (quatre), for orchestra
  - Symphony No. 3 (Symphonie concertante), for violin, viola, cello, piano, and orchestra
- Virgil Thomson
  - La belle en dormant, for voice and piano
  - Chamber Music, for voice and piano
  - Serenade, for flute and violin
  - Stabat mater, for soprano and string quartet
  - String Quartet No. 1
  - Symphony No. 2 in C major
- Randall Thompson – Symphony No. 2 in E minor
- Michael Tippett – Symphonic Movement, for orchestra
- Henri Tomasi
  - Capriccio, for violin and orchestra
  - Chansons des sables, for voice and orchestra [from Tam-tam]
  - Chants de Cyrnos, for voice and orchestra or piano
  - Fantoches, for piano
  - Tam-tam, symphonic poem, for orchestra
- Eduard Tubin – Suite on Estoninian Motifs, for orchestra
- Joaquín Turina
  - El castillo de Almodóvar, for piano (also orchestrated), op. 65
  - El circo, for piano, op. 68
  - Jardín de niños, for piano, op. 63
  - Pieza romántica, for piano, op. 64
  - Piano Quartet in A minor, op. 67
  - Radio Madrid, for piano, op. 62,
  - Rapsodia sinfónica, for piano and strings, op. 66
  - Guitar Sonata, op. 61
- Geirr Tveitt – Prillar, for orchestra
- Edgard Varèse – Ionisation
- Ralph Vaughan Williams
  - In Windsor Forest, Cantata for chorus and orchestra, adapted from the opera Sir John in Love
  - Abinger (I Vow to Thee My Country)
  - Mantegna (Into the Woods My Master Went)
  - Marathon (Servants of the Great Adventure)
  - Piano Concerto in C major
  - White Gates (Fierce Raged the Tempest)
- Louis Vierne
  - Les Angélus, for voice and organ (or orchestra), op. 57
  - La ballade du désespéré, for soprano and orchestra, op. 61
  - Triptyque, for organ, op. 58,
- Heitor Villa-Lobos
  - Caixinha de música quebrada, for piano
  - String Quartet No. 5 (Quarteto brasileiro no. 1)
- John Vincent – A Folk Song Symphony, for orchestra
- William Walton
  - Belshazzar's Feast (oratorio)
  - "Make we joy in this fest" (traditional carol), set for SATB choir
- Kurt Weill – Mann ist Mann, incidental music to the play by Bertolt Brecht
- Jaromir Weinberger
  - Overture to a Chivalrous Play, for orchestra
  - Passacaglia, for organ and orchestra
- Egon Wellesz – Mitte des Lebens, cantata for soprano, choir, and orchestra, op. 45
- Mark Wessel
  - Ballade, for violin, oboe and string orchestra
  - Feminine Conversations and Promenade of Respectable People, for piano
  - Prelude and Fugue, for string quartet
  - Scherzo burlesque, for piano and orchestra
  - Sextet, for woodwinds and piano
  - String Quartet No. 1
- Stefan Wolpe
  - Agitprop Lieder, medium voice
  - Zwei Lieder von Ernst Ottwald, medium voice
  - Lieder (Acht), for voice and piano
  - Die Mausefalle, incidental music for the play by Gustav von Wangenheim
- Ivan Wyschnegradsky
  - String Quartet No. 2, Op. 18
  - Deux études de concert, for two quarter-tone pianos, op. 19
  - Étude en forme de scherzo, for two quarter-tone pianos, op. 20
- Riccardo Zandonai – Quadri di Segantini, for orchestra

== Opera ==
- Paul Abraham – Die Blume von Hawaii (operetta), staged 24 July, in Leipzig, Neues Theater
- George Antheil – Helen Retires (not performed until 1934)
- Arthur Benjamin – The Devil Take Her, staged 1 December, London, Royal College of Music
- Alfredo Casella – La donna serpente, op. 50 (not performed until 1932)
- Gustave Charpentier – Orphée (unfinished)
- Werner Egk – Der Löwe und die Maus (children's opera)
- George Enescu – Œdipe, op. 23 (not performed until 1936)
- Walter Goehr – Malpopita (written for radio broadcast; first live performance 2004)
- Louis Gruenberg
  - The Emperor Jones, op. 36 (not staged until 1933)
  - Jack and the Beanstalk, op. 35, staged 20 November, Juilliard School, New York
- Jesús Guridi – La cautiva, staged 10 February, Calderón Theater, Madrid
- Arthur Honegger – La belle de Moudon (operetta), staged 30 May, in Mézières, Théâtre du Jorat (Switzerland)
- Jacques Ibert – Gonzague, staged 17 December, Monte Carlo
- Mikhail Ippolitov-Ivanov – Zhenit'ba [The Marriage], op. 70, staged 18 October at the Radio Theatre, Moscow [first of the four acts is by Musorgsky]
- Lev Knipper – Goroda i godï [Cities and Years], op. 22
- Eduard Künneke – Nadja, op. 28, performed in Kassel
- Gian Francesco Malipiero
  - Torneo notturno, staged 15 May at the Nationaltheater in Munich
  - I trionfi d'amore, triptych (unperformed except for the second opera, Mascherati, not staged until 1954)
- Italo Montemezzi – La notte di Zoraima, staged 31 January, Teatro alla Scala, Milan
- Hans Pfitzner – Das Herz, op. 39, staged 12 November, simultaneously in Berlin and Munich
- Jean Roger-Ducasse – Cantegril, staged 9 February at the Opéra-Comique (Salle Favart), Paris
- Germaine Tailleferre – Zoulaina (never performed)
- Deems Taylor – Peter Ibbetson, op. 20, staged 7 February, Metropolitan Opera, New York
- Gabriel von Wayditch – Horus (not staged until 1939)
- Egon Wellesz – Die Bakchantinnen, staged 20 June, Wiener Staatsoper, Vienna
- Jaromir Weinberger – Milovaný hlas [Die geliebte Stimme], staged 28 February, Munich
- Ermanno Wolf-Ferrari – La vedova scaltra, staged 5 March, at the Teatro dell'Opera di Roma, Rome
- Eugène Ysaÿe – Piére li houïeu [Peter the Miner], staged 4 March in Liège

== Film ==
- Werner R. Heymann – Der Kongreß tanzt
- Dmitri Shostakovich – Alone (1931 Soviet film)
- Dmitri Shostakovich – Golden Mountains (film)

== Musical theater ==
- America's Sweetheart Broadway production opened at the Broadhurst Theatre on February 10 and ran for 135 performances.
- The Band Wagon Broadway production opened at the New Amsterdam Theatre on June 3 and ran for 260 performances
- Bitter Sweet (Noël Coward) – London revival
- The Cat and the Fiddle Broadway production opened at the Globe Theatre on October 15 and ran for 395 performances
- Cavalcade (Noël Coward) – London production opened at the Drury Lane Theatre on October 13 and ran for 405 performances
- Die Dubarry Berlin production opened on August 14
- Folly To Be Wise London revue opened at the Piccadilly Theatre on January 8. Starring Cicely Courtneidge.
- Here Goes the Bride Broadway production opened at Chanin's 46th Street Theatre on November 3 and ran for 7 performances.
- Hold My Hand (Music: Noel Gay Lyrics: Desmond Carter Book: Stanley Lupino) London production opened at the Gaiety Theatre on December 23. Starring Jessie Matthews, Sonnie Hale and Stanley Lupino.
- The Land of Smiles (Franz Lehár) – London production opened at the Drury Lane Theatre on May 8
- The Laugh Parade Broadway revue opened at the Imperial Theatre on November 2 and ran for 231 performances
- Of Thee I Sing Broadway production, opened December 26 and ran for 441 performances.
- The Third Little Show Broadway production opened at the Music Box Theatre on June 1 and ran for 136 performances
- Victoria and Her Hussar London production opened at the Palace Theatre on September 17 and ran for 100 performances
- White Horse Inn London production opened at the Coliseum Theatre on April 8 and ran for 651 performances
- Ziegfeld Follies of 1931 Broadway revue opened at the Ziegfeld Theatre on July 1 and ran for 165 performances.

== Musical films ==
- Alam Ara, starring Master Vithal and Zubeida, with music by Ferozshah M. Mistri and B. Irani
- A Caprice of Pompadour (Un caprice de la Pompadour), starring André Baugé
- Autumn Roses (Rosas de otoño), starring Francisco Canaro, with music by Guillermo Barbieri and José Rial
- Children of Dreams starring Margaret Schilling, Paul Gregory and Tom Patricola
- City of Song, starring Jan Kiepura, with music by Paul Abraham, Philip Braham and Ernesto Tagliaferri
- The Cuban Love Song starring Lawrence Tibbett, Lupe Vélez, Jimmy Durante and Louise Fazenda
- Delicious starring Janet Gaynor, Charles Farrell and El Brendl.
- Die Fledermaus, starring Anny Ondra, Georg Alexander and Oskar Sima, with music by Johann Strauss II.
- Her Majesty, Love starring Marilyn Miller
- The Hot Heiress starring Ben Lyon and Ona Munson
- Huwen op Bevel
- Kiss Me Again starring Bernice Claire and Edward Everett Horton
- Madame Pompadour (Die Marquise von Pompadour), starring Anny Ahlers, Kurt Gerron and Walter Jankuhn, with music by Eduard Künneke, Rudolf Nelson and Robert Stolz
- Le Million starring Annabella and René Lefèvre
- Palmy Days starring Eddie Cantor and Charlotte Greenwood
- Pardon Us starring Stan Laurel and Oliver Hardy. Directed by James Parrott.
- The Prodigal starring Lawrence Tibbett
- Sally in Our Alley starring Gracie Fields
- Showgirl's Luck starring Susan Denis, Arthur Tauchert, Arthur Clarke and Fred Bluett
- The Private Secretary (Die Privatsekretärin), starring Renate Müller, Hermann Thimig and Felix Bressart, with music by Paul Abraham and Lajos Lajtai
- The Smiling Lieutenant starring Maurice Chevalier, Claudette Colbert and Miriam Hopkins
- Sunshine Susie starring Renate Müller and Jack Hulbert

== Births ==
- January 5 – Alfred Brendel, pianist (died 2025)
- January 8 – Bill Graham, rock music entrepreneur (died 1991)
- January 12 – Roland Alphonso, saxophonist (died 1998)
- January 14 – Caterina Valente, multilingual singer (died 2024)
- January 21 – Rudi Maugeri, pop singer (The Crew-Cuts) (died 2004)
- January 22 – Sam Cooke, singer (died 1964)
- January 26 – Kaare Ørnung, Norwegian pianist, music teacher (died 2013)
- January 29 – Leslie Bricusse, film and stage composer and lyricist (died 2021)
- February 12 – Walt Groller, accordionist and polka musician
- February 14 – Phyllis McGuire, vocalist (The McGuire Sisters) (died 2020)
- March 5 – Barry Tuckwell, horn player (died 2020)
- March 15 – D. J. Fontana, drummer (died 2018)
- March 25
  - Vytautas Barkauskas, composer (died 2020)
  - Humphrey Burton, television music and arts presenter (died 2025)
  - Paul Motian, jazz drummer (died 2011)
- April 29 – Lonnie Donegan, skiffle musician (died 2002)
- May 4 – Ed Cassidy, drummer (Spirit) (died 2012)
- May 7 – Teresa Brewer, singer (died 2007)
- May 14
  - Aloys Kontarsky, pianist (died 2017)
  - Alvin Lucier, composer (died 2021)
- May 19 – Éric Tappy, Swiss tenor
- June 10 – João Gilberto, bossa nova musician (died 2019)
- June 11
  - Margarita Pracatan, Cuban-born novelty singer (died 2020)
  - Audrey Schuh, American soprano
- June 17 – Dominic Frontiere, accordionist and composer (died 2017)
- July 6 – Della Reese, actress and singer (died 2017)
- July 10 – Jerry Herman, American musical theater composer and lyricist (died 2019)
- July 11 – Tab Hunter, actor and singer (died 2018)
- July 18 – Papa Dee Allen, funk musician (War) (died 1988)
- July 21 – Plas Johnson, American saxophonist (B. Bumble and the Stingers and The Wrecking Crew)
- July 31
  - Kenny Burrell, jazz guitarist
  - Morey Carr (The Playmates) (died 1987)
- August 1 – Rostislav Grigor'yevich Boyko, Russian composer and conductor (died 2002)
- August 28
  - John Perkins (The Crew-Cuts)
  - John Shirley-Quirk, operatic bass-baritone (died 2014)
- September 1
  - Richard Hundley, American pianist, composer (died 2018)
  - Javier Solís, Mexican ranchera & bolero singer (died 1966)
- September 4 – Mitzi Gaynor, actress and singer
- September 12 – George Jones, country singer (died 2013)
- September 19 – Brook Benton, singer and songwriter (died 1988)
- September 22 – George Chambers (The Chambers Brothers) (died 2019)
- September 24 – Anthony Newley, English songwriter, actor and singer (died 1999)
- October 1 – Alan Wagner, American opera critic (died 2007)
- October 15 – Freddy Cole, jazz singer and pianist (died 2020)
- October 24 – Sofia Gubaidulina, composer (died 2025)
- November 2 – Phil Woods, jazz saxophonist (died 2015)
- November 5 – Ike Turner, musician and record producer (died 2007)
- November 16
  - Bob Gibson, folk musician (died 1996)
  - Hubert Sumlin, blues guitarist (died 2011)
- December 2 – Wynton Kelly, pianist (died 1971)
- December 21 – David Baker, American composer and educator (died 2016)
- December 24
  - Ray Bryant, jazz pianist (died 2011)
  - Mauricio Kagel, composer (died 2008)
- December 27 – Scotty Moore, guitarist (died 2016)
- December 30 – Skeeter Davis, country singer (died 2004)

== Deaths ==
- January 5 – Colonel Charles Gerard Conn, instrument manufacturer (born 1884)
- January 9 – James Frederick Swift, organist and composer (born 1847)
- January 21 – Felix Blumenfeld, pianist, conductor and composer (born 1863)
- January 23 – Anna Pavlova, ballerina (born 1881)
- February 16 – Dirk Schäfer, pianist and composer (born 1873)
- February 23
  - Mario Ancona, bel canto baritone (born 1860)
  - Dame Nellie Melba, operatic soprano (born 1861)
- March 25 – Tomasz Bartkiewcz, organist and composer (born 1865)
- April 4 – George Whitefield Chadwick, composer (born 1854)
- May 8
  - Bertha Lewis, singer and actress with the D'Oyly Carte Opera Company (born 1887) (car accident)
  - Paolo Litta, composer (born 1871)
- May 12 – Eugène Ysaÿe, violinist and composer (born 1858)
- May 13 – Josif Marinković, composer (born 1851)
- June 18 – Fanny Holland, singer and actress (born 1847)
- June 21 – Jimmy Blythe, jazz pianist (born 1901)
- July 2 – Charles Quef, organist and composer (born 1873)
- July 4 – Buddy Petit, jazz cornet player (born c. 1890)
- July 23 – William Wolstenholme, organist and composer (born 1865)
- August 6 – Bix Beiderbecke, jazz musician (born 1903)
- August 11 – Linda Loredo, dancer (born 1907)
- August 19 – Francisco Cimadevilla González, guitarist and composer (born 1861)
- August 22 – Joseph Tabrar, songwriter (born 1857)
- August 26 – Heinrich Grünfeld, cellist (born 1855)
- August 28 – Jane Green singer (born 1897)
- September 3 – Franz Schalk, conductor (born 1863)
- September 6 – Juliana Walanika, the "Hawaiian Nightingale", court singer (born 1846)
- September 10 – Alfonso Rendano, pianist, inventor of the "third pedal" (born 1853)
- September 20 – Ugo Falena, opera librettist (born 1875)
- September 23
  - Harry Macdonough, pioneer recording artist (born 1871)
  - Adolf Weidig, composer (born 1867)
- October 3 – Carl Nielsen, composer (born 1865)
- October 8 – Luigi von Kunits, violinist, conductor and composer (born 1870)
- October 18 – Thomas Edison, inventor of the phonograph (born 1847)
- October 20 – Emánuel Moór, pianist, composer and inventor of the Duplex-Coupler Grand Pianoforte (born 1863)
- October 21 – Barbecue Bob, blues musician (born 1902)
- October 29 – Luciano Gallet, composer (born 1893)
- November 4 – Buddy Bolden, jazz musician (born 1877)
- November 17 – Georgi Atanasov, composer (born 1882)
- November 19 – Frederic Cliffe, composer (born 1857)
- November 23 – Leonora Braham, operatic soprano and actress (Gilbert & Sullivan) (born 1853)
- December 2 – Vincent d'Indy, composer (born 1851)
