= People's Hall =

People's Hall may refer to:

- Great Hall of the People, in Beijing, China
- Sedbergh People's Hall, village hall in Sedbergh, Cumbria, England
- Jinnah's People's Memorial Hall, in Mumbai, India
- People's Hall, Tripoli, in Libya
