= Boop-Oop-a-Doop =

1932 animated short film

- Directed by: Dave Fleischer
- Produced by: Max Fleischer
- Starring: Margie Hines; Mae Questel
- Production company: Fleischer Studios
- Distributed by: Paramount Pictures
- Release date: January 16, 1932
- Running time: 9 minutes
- Country: United States
- Language: English

Boop-Oop-a-Doop is an animated short film created by Fleischer Studios and released on January 16, 1932, which is part of the Talkartoon series.

== Plot ==
The film begins with an image of Betty Boop on a flag, which is flying over a circus big top. Soon it shows Betty performing as a lion tamer and then a tightrope walker. Koko the Clown is another of the other circus attractions. While Betty performs on the highwire, the villainous ringmaster lusts for her as he watches from below, singing "Do Something", a song previously performed by Helen Kane. As Betty returns to her tent, the ringmaster follows her inside and sensually strokes her legs, surrounds her and threatens her job if she does not submit. Betty begs the ringmaster to cease his advances, as she sings "Don't Take My Boop-Oop-A-Doop Away". Koko the Clown is outside, practicing his juggling, and hears the struggle. He leaps in to save Betty's virtue. Koko struggles with the ringmaster, who loads him into a cannon, fires it, and, thinking that he has sent Koko away, laughs with self-satisfaction. Koko is hiding inside the cannon, and strikes the ringmaster out cold with a mallet, returning with "the last laugh". When Koko expresses concern about Betty's welfare, she answers in song, "No, he couldn't take my boop-oop-a-doop away!" The film ends with Koko kissing Betty on the cheek.

== See also ==
- Musical Justice (Betty Boop cartoon)
