= One More Time (1931 song) =

"One More Time" is a popular song, one of the last written by the songwriting team of DeSylva, Brown, and Henderson. It was published in 1931. It was the last song recorded by Bing Crosby as a big band singer, before becoming a soloist. Crosby recorded the song for Victor Records with Gus Arnheim and his orchestra on March 2, 1931. The recording was very popular and reached the charts of the day.

== Other recordings ==
- 1931 Roy Fox and His Band (vocal: Al Bowlly) recorded March 25, 1931. (Al Bowlly Discography).
- 1954 Although Perry Como recorded the song with The Ames Brothers in 1954, the recording was never released, apparently because RCA engineers did not think the sounds of Como's and Ed Ames' voices mixed well.
- 1956 Gordon MacRae - used in the film The Best Things in Life Are Free and in the soundtrack album.
