= Al Bowlly discography =

Albert Allick "Al" Bowlly (7 January 1899 – 17 April 1941) was a Mozambican-born South African/British singer, songwriter, composer and band leader, who became Britain's popular singer and crooner during the British dance band era of the 1930s. He recorded more than 1,000 records between 1927 and 1941. His most popular songs include "Midnight, the Stars and You", "Goodnight, Sweetheart", "The Very Thought of You", "Guilty" and "Love Is the Sweetest Thing".

== Discography of 78 rpm singles ==
Date	Song
April 1926	"House Where the Shutters Are Green" (vocal by Pete Harmon, Al Bowlly on banjo)
April 1926	"Soho Blues" (vocal by Pete Harmon, Al Bowlly on banjo)
c. July 1927	"Song of the Wanderer"
c. July 1927	"Muddy Water" (no vocal?)
c. July 1927	"Hallelujah" (no vocal. Al Bowlly on banjo)
c. July 1927	"Miss Annabelle Lee" (no vocal?)
c. July 1927	"Memphis" (no vocal?)
c. July 1927	"Rio Rita" (no vocal?)
c. July 1927	"I'm Looking for a Girl Named Mary" (no vocal?)
c. July 1927	"Cheritza" (no vocal?)
c. August 1927	"Ain't She Sweet"
c. August 1927	"Do the Black Bottom with Me"
c. August 1927	"Souvenirs"
c. August 1927	"Why Don't You?"
c. August 1927	"Since I Found You"
c. August 1927	"Who-Oo? You-Oo, That's Who!"
c. August 1927	"Rosy Cheeks"
c. August 1927	"Roses for Remembrance"
c. August 1927	"I'm Coming Virginia"
c. August 1927	"It All Depends on You"
c. September 1927	"Me and My Shadow"
c. September 1927	"Are You Happy?"
c. September 1927	"My Regular Girl"
c. September 1927	"I'm Walking on Air"
c. September 1927	"Sometimes I'm Happy"
c. September 1927	"Ain't That a Grand and Glorious Feeling?"
c. September 1927	"Sweet Marie"
c. September 1927	"Take Your Finger Out of Your Mouth"
September 1927	"Little White House"
11 September 1927	"Blue Skies"
11 September 1927	"Say, Mister! Have You Met Rosie's Sister?"
12 September 1927	"Ain't She Sweet"
12 September 1927	"In a Little Spanish Town"
c. September 1927	"All Day Long"
c. September 1927	"I'm Looking for a Bluebird (To Chase the Blues away)"
22 September 1927	"Muddy Water, A Mississippi Moan"
22 September 1927	"A Dream of You"
23 September 1927	"Because I Love You"
23 September 1927	"I'm Alone in Athlone"
28 September 1927	"Sunny Disposish"
18 November 1927	"When You Played the Organ and I Sang the Rosary"
18 November 1927	"Dear Little Gadabout"
18 November 1927	"Every Little Thing I Do"
18 November 1927	"Rosy Cheeks"
18 November 1927	"My Regular Girl"
18 November 1927	"Positively-Absolutely"
c. December 1927	"Dawn of Tomorrow"
c. December 1927	"While the Others Were Dancing"
c. December 1927	"Rio Rita"
c. December 1927	"Souvenirs"
17 January 1928	"I Love No-One but You"
17 January 1928	"My Blue Heaven"
17 January 1928	"Just Once Again"
18 January 1928	"A Shady Tree"
18 January 1928	"Are You Thinking Of Me Tonight?"
18 January 1928	"My Regular Girl"
20 January 1928	"Can't You Hear Me Say "I Love You"?"
June–July 1928	"Hallelujah"
June–July 1928	"Under the Moon" (with Billy Bartholomew)
June–July 1928	"A Little Girl, A Little Boy, A Little Moon"
June–July 1928	"C'est Vous"
June–July 1928	"Can't You Hear Me Say "I Love You"?"
June–July 1928	"After My Laughter Came Tears"
June–July 1928	"Changes"
June–July 1928	"Sweetheart of Sigma Chi"
June–July 1928	"I Wonder"
June–July 1928	"Beloved"
June–July 1928	"When"
c. 25 July 1928	"Just Imagine"
c. 25 July 1928	"Wherever You Are"
c. 12 November 1928	"Sometimes"
c. 21 November 1928	"If I Had You"
December 1928	"Misery Farm"
December 1928	"I'm Sorry, Sally"
April 1929	"When the Lilac Blooms Again"
April 1929	"Up in the Clouds"
15 May 1929	"Honeymoon Chimes"
5 November 1929	"Lay My Head Beneath a Rose"
5 November 1929	"Last Night I Dreamed You Kissed Me"
c. November 1929	"The Pagan Love Song" (with Les Allen)
c. November 1929	"This Is Heaven" (with Les Allen)
c. November 1929	"S'posin'" (with Les Allen)
4 December 1929	"After the Sun Kissed the World Goodbye"
4 December 1929	"If Anything Happened to You"
24 January 1930	"An Old Italian Love Song"
24 January 1930	"In The Moonlight"
c. February 1930	"Rio Rita" (with Cavan O'Connor)
7 March 1930	"Silvery Moon"
c. March 1930	"Silv'ry Moon"
c. March 1930	"Happy Days Are Here Again"
c. March 1930	"Gipsy Dream Rose"
c. March 1930	"Silv'ry Moon"
c. March 1930	"Land of the Might-Have-Been"
c. March 1930	"Somehow"
c. March 1930	"Lazy Lou'siana Moon"
10 June 1930	"Sy's in die Pad" (in Afrikaans)
30 June 1930	"Alleenig" (in Afrikaans)
2 July 1930	"Every Little Kindness (Makes an Angel Smile)"
2 July 1930	"My Angel Mother"
2 July 1930	"The Golden Gates of Paradise"
2 July 1930	"The Hymns My Mother Used to Sing"
14 July 1930	"Banditlied" (The Prisoner's Song) (in Afrikaans)
14 July 1930	"The Lonesome Road" (in Afrikaans)
14 July 1930	"Kleine Maat (Little Pal)" (in Afrikaans)
14 July 1930	"Ou Kaapstad is mijn Hemel-land" (in Afrikaans)
2 August 1930	"On the Sunny Side of the Street"
2 August 1930	"Sweepin' the Clouds Away"
2 August 1930	"Song of the Dawn" (with Hubert Wallace)
2 August 1930	"Dancing with Tears in My Eyes"
early September 1930	"Falling in Love Again" (with Les Allen)
early September 1930	"Say a Little Prayer for Me" (with Les Allen)
early September 1930	"One Night Alone with You" (with Les Allen)
early September 1930	"A Bench in the Park" (with Les Allen)
early September 1930	"Happy Feet" (with Les Allen)
early September 1930	"Blue Is the Night" (with Les Allen)
early September 1930	"Cheer up and Smile" (with Les Allen)
19 September 1930	"Rose Dreams"
19 September 1930	"Blue Pacific Moonlight"
19 September 1930	"Here in My Heart"
19 September 1930	"That Little Lock of Hair"
24 September 1930	"There's a Stranger in Heaven Tonight"
24 September 1930	"Aloha Oe" (with chorus)
24 September 1930	"Goodbye to All That" (with Les Allen)
24 September 1930	"Sleepy Head"
24 September 1930	"Golden Gates of Paradise"
10 October 1930	"Sal die Eng'le hulle Harpe speel vir mij? (Will the Angels Play Their Harps for Me?)" (in Afrikaans)
10 October 1930	"Voetslaan op oom Jacob se Leer" (in Afrikaans)
10 October 1930	"Daar is geen ron in die Hemel" (in Afrikaans)
10 October 1930	"Die ou lelie Vallei" (in Afrikaans)
c. 17 October 1930	"Great Day" (with Les Allen)
c. 17 October 1930	"Without a Song" (with Les Allen)
c. 17 October 1930	"Livin' in the Sunlight, Lovin' in the Moonlight" (with Les Allen)
c. 17 October 1930	"You Brought a New Kind of Love to Me" (with Les Allen)
c. 24 October 1930	"Sleepy Head" (with Les Allen)
c. 24 October 1930	"That's My Song of Love" (with Les Allen)
c. 24 October 1930	"Waiting for That Thing Called Happiness" (with Les Allen)
late October 1930	"Adeline"
3 November 1930	"Lonely Little Vagabond"
3 November 1930	"She's My Secret Passion"
early November 1930	"That's My Song of Love" (with unknown)
early November 1930	"That Little Lock of Hair (My Mother Gave to Me)" (with unknown)
early November 1930	"She's My Secret Passion"
early November 1930	"Lonely Little Vagabond"
early November 1930	"There's a Stranger in Heaven Tonight"
early November 1930	"Sleepy Head"
early November 1930	"With My Guitar and You" (with Les Allen)
early November 1930	"Go Home and Tell Your Mother" (with Les Allen)
13 November 1930	"Old Spanish Moon"
13 November 1930	"Love Never Dies"
13 November 1930	"Why Did You Turn Me down?"
13 November 1930	"Lullaby Land"
13 November 1930	"Lovebirds Are Better than Bluebirds"
13 November 1930	"Headin' for Hollywood"
November 1930	"Moonlight on the Colorado" (with Les Allen)
November 1930	"Cuban Love Song" (with Les Allen)
November 1930	"The Kiss Waltz" (with Les Allen)
November 1930	"With My Guitar and You" (with Les Allen)
November 1930	"Bye Bye Blues" (with Les Allen)
November 1930	"Old New England Moon" (with Les Allen)
November 1930	"What a Perfect Night for Love"
November 1930	"Beware of Love"
20 November 1930	"I'm Telling the World She's Mine"
20 November 1930	"How Could I Be Lonely?"
24 November 1930	"Nigger Blues"
24 November 1930	"Frankie and Johnny" (with Ella Logan)
24 November 1930	"By the Old Oak Tree" (with Ella Logan)
1 December 1930	"What a Perfect Night for Love" (with Les Allen)
1 December 1930	"The "Free and Easy"" (with Les Allen)
1 December 1930	"My Cradle Is the Desert" (with Les Allen)
1 December 1930	"A Japanese Dream" (with Les Allen)
December 1930	"Never Swat a Fly"
December 1930	"Sunny Days" (with Marius B. Winter)
December 1930	"Roamin' Thru' the Roses"
17 December 1930	"There's a Stranger in Heaven Tonight"
17 December 1930	"Sleepy Head"
17 December 1930	"In an Old Churchyard"
17 December 1930	"The Silver-Toned Chimes of the Angelus"
18 December 1930	"That's What Loneliness Means to Me"
18 December 1930	"The Farmyard Symphony"
18 December 1930	"The Village Jazz Band"
30 December 1930	"My Sunshine Came on a Rainy Day" (with Les Allen)
30 December 1930	"Underneath the Spanish Stars" (with Les Allen)
30 December 1930	"A Little Love Song" (with Les Allen)
30 December 1930	"Okay, Baby" (with Les Allen)
31 December 1930	"Underneath the Spanish Stars"
31 December 1930	"Sunny Days"
31 December 1930	"Make Yourself a Happiness Pie"
5 January 1931	"Memories of You"
5 January 1931	"You're Lucky to Me"
5 January 1931	"Thank Your Father"
c. 9 January 1931	"Old-Fashioned Girl" (with Les Allen)
c. 9 January 1931	"Never Swat a Fly" (with Les Allen)
c. 9 January 1931	"Sweet Jennie Lee" (with Les Allen)
c. 9 January 1931	"You're Driving Me Crazy" (with Les Allen)
16 January 1931	"Can't We Be Friends?"
January 1931	"My Bluebird Was Caught in the Rain"
January 1931	"Somewhere in Old Wyoming" (with Les Allen)
January 1931	"Oh Donna Clara!" (with Les Allen)
January 1931	"Nobody Cares If I'm Blue" (with Les Allen)
January 1931	"There's Something About an Old-Fashioned Girl"
January 1931	"Okay, Baby" (with Marius B. Winter(?))
January 1931	"A Little Love Song"
23 January 1931	"Somewhere in Old Wyoming" (with Les Allen)
23 January 1931	"Oh! Donna Clara" (with Les Allen)
23 January 1931	"Hurt"
24 January 1931	"Wedding Bells Are Ringing for Sally"
24 January 1931	"Missouri Waltz"
24 January 1931	"Lady, Play Your Mandolin"
28 January 1931	"Hurt"
28 January 1931	"Writing a Letter to You"
28 January 1931	"A Peach of a Pair"
9 February 1931	"Between the Devil and the Deep Blue Sea" (with chorus)
9 February 1931	"The Peanut Vendor" (with chorus)
9 February 1931	"Maybe It's Love" (with chorus)
9 February 1931	"'Neath Hawaiian Skies"
9 February 1931	"Really Mine"
February 1931	"Tap Your Feet"
February 1931	"Makin' Wicki-Wacki down in Waikiki"
19 February 1931	"Time on My Hands"
19 February 1931	"Makin' Wickey-Wackey down in Waikiki"
19 February 1931	"Shout for Happiness"
19 February 1931	"Goodnight, Sweetheart"
19 February 1931	"I'm Glad I Waited"
19 February 1931	"Really Mine"
19 February 1931	"Puzzle Record No. 1 – Part 1" Al Bowlly sings a chorus of "You're Driving Me Crazy"
26 February 1931	"You're the One I Care For"
26 February 1931	"Overnight"
26 February 1931	"Shout! for Happiness"
c. 3 March 1931	"Sweet Jennie Lee" (with Les Allen)
c. 3 March 1931	"Ti-dle-id-idle-um-pum" (with Les Allen)
5 March 1931	"When Your Hair Has Turned to Silver"
5 March 1931	"Bathing in the Sunshine"
5 March 1931	"Reaching for the Moon"
5 March 1931	"All Through the Night"
9 March 1931	"Puzzle Record No. 2 – Part 1" Al Bowlly sings a chorus of "I'll Be Good Because of You"
9 March 1931	"Puzzle Record No. 2 – Part 2" Al Bowlly sings a chorus of "Goodnight, Sweetheart"
10 March 1931	"Them There Eyes" (with chorus)
10 March 1931	"That Lindy Hop"
10 March 1931	"Truly" (with chorus)
13 March 1931	"I'm Glad I Waited"
24 March 1931	"Rages of Radioland – Part 1" Al Bowlly sings a chorus of "Without a Song"
24 March 1931	"Rages of Radioland – Part 2" Al Bowlly sings a chorus of "Falling in Love Again"
24 March 1931	"We Two"
24 March 1931	"Lady of Spain"
25 March 1931	"One More Time"
25 March 1931	"Lady of Spain"
25 March 1931	"Time on My Hands"
26 March 1931	"Sunshine and Shadows"
late March 1931	"All Through the Night"
late March 1931	"Maybe It's Love" (with Les Allen)
1 April 1931	"Alma Mia" (with chorus)
1 April 1931	"Koppa-Ka-Banna" (with chorus)
15 April 1931	"Betty Co-ed"
15 April 1931	"You Didn't Have to Tell Me"
15 April 1931	"When It's Sunset on the Nile"
21 April 1931	"Would You Like to Take a Walk?"
21 April 1931	"Laughing at the Rain"
21 April 1931	"Ya Got Love"
21 April 1931	"Bubbling over with Love"
late April 1931	"Why Couldn't You?"
late April 1931	"Tango Lady"
late April 1931	"Really Mine"
28 April 1931	"That's Somerset"
28 April 1931	"Fiesta"
28 April 1931	"You're Twice as Nice as the Girl in My Dreams"
5 May 1931	"Fiesta"
5 May 1931	"By My Side"
5 May 1931	"My Temptation"
6 May 1931	"Song Hits – Part 1" Al Bowlly & Les Allen sing a chorus of "Reaching for the Moon"
6 May 1931	"Song Hits – Part 4" Al Bowlly & Les Allen sing a chorus of "Bubbling over with Love"
6 May 1931	"Song Hits – Part 3" Al Bowlly & Les Allen sing a chorus of "Lady of Spain"
6 May 1931	"Song Hits – Part 2" Al Bowlly & Les Allen sing a chorus of "Hawaiian Stars Are Gleaming"
29 May 1931	"On with the Show – Part 1" Al Bowlly sings a chorus of "On a Little Balcony in Spain"
29 May 1931	"Lights of Paris"
29 May 1931	"June-Time Is Love Time"
29 May 1931	"On with the Show – Part 2" Al Bowlly sings a chorus of "Pretty Kitty Kelly"
1 June 1931	"I'm So Used to You Now"
1 June 1931	"I'm Gonna Get You"
1 June 1931	"It Must Be True"
1 June 1931	"Leave the Rest to Nature"
early June 1931	"My Canary Has Circles Under His Eyes"
early June 1931	"Miss Elizabeth Brown"
early June 1931	"At Last I'm Happy"
early June 1931	"Lights of Paris"
early June 1931	"Bell-Bottom Trousers"
early June 1931	"Ya Got Love"
early June 1931	"Walkin' My Baby Back Home"
early June 1931	"Thank You Most Sincerely"
early June 1931	"Life Is Meant for Love"
early June 1931	"Time on My Hands"
early June 1931	"Walkin' My Baby Back Home"
early June 1931	"Let's Get Friendly"
early June 1931	"Time on My Hands"
early June 1931	"I'm Glad I Waited"
10 June 1931	"I'm So Used to You Now"
10 June 1931	"Leave the Rest to Nature"
11 June 1931	"Roll on, Mississippi, Roll on" (with The Three Ginx)
11 June 1931	"Lazy Day"
11 June 1931	"I'd Rather Be a Beggar with You"
16 June 1931	"Lazy Day"
16 June 1931	"Poor Kid"
mid June 1931	"Leave the Rest to Nature"
mid June 1931	"I'm So Used to You Now"
mid June 1931	"Goodnight Sweetheart"
late June 1931	"Shake and Let Us Be Friends"
late June 1931	"I'll Keep You in My Heart Always"
late June 1931	"Oh! Rosalita"
late June 1931	"Bubbling over with Love"
late June 1931	"I Offer You These Roses"
26 June 1931	"Miracle Melodies – Part 1" Al Bowlly sings a chorus of "Goodnight, Sweetheart"
26 June 1931	"Holiday Hits – Part 1" Al Bowlly sings a chorus of "Goodnight Sweetheart"
26 June 1931	"Holiday Hits – Part 2" Al Bowlly sings a chorus of "River, Stay 'Way from My Door"
10 July 1931	"Topical Tunes Medley – Part 1" Al Bowlly sings a chorus of "What a Fool I've Been"
10 July 1931	"Springtime Reminds Me of You"
10 July 1931	"The Waltz You Saved for Me"
10 July 1931	"Topical Tunes Medley – Part 2" Al Bowlly sings a chorus of "Pardon Me, Pretty Baby"
14 July 1931	"Tunes of Not-So-Long-Ago – 1921" Al Bowlly sings a chorus each of "Coal Black Mammy" and "Swanee"
14 July 1931	"Tunes of Not-So-Long-Ago – 1923" Al Bowlly sings a chorus each of "My Sweetie Went Away" and "Yes! We Have No Bananas"
21 July 1931	"When You Were the Blossom of Buttercup Lane"
21 July 1931	"Tie a Little String Around Your Finger"
21 July 1931	"I Found You"
21 July 1931	"Love for Sale"
c. late July 1931	"Goodnight"
31 July 1931	"Roll on, Mississippi, Roll on"
31 July 1931	"Out of Nowhere"
31 July 1931	"While Hearts Are Singing"
31 July 1931	"I'd Rather Be a Beggar with You"
early August 1931	"Belle of Barcelona"
early August 1931	"I'm a Hundred Per Cent in Love with You"
early August 1931	"Poor Kid"
early August 1931	"Mama Inez"
14 August 1931	"Pagan Serenade"
14 August 1931	"Belle of Barcelona"
14 August 1931	"There's Something in Your Eyes"
14 August 1931	"Just a Dancing Sweetheart"
18 August 1931	"Tell Me, Are You from Georgia?" (with Nat Gonella)
18 August 1931	"You Are My Heart's Delight"
18 August 1931	"Cherie, c'est vous"
25 August 1931	"When It's Sunset on the Nile"
25 August 1931	"Honeymoon Lane"
25 August 1931	"Hang Out the Stars in Indiana"
late August 1931	"Roll on, Mississippi, Roll on"
late August 1931	"Heartaches"
late August 1931	"Time Alone Will Tell"
late August 1931	"Tell Me You Love Me"
2 September 1931	"Were You Sincere?"
2 September 1931	"I'd Rather Be a Beggar with You"
3 September 1931	"You Can't Stop Me from Loving You"
3 September 1931	"Dance Hall Doll"
3 September 1931	"What Are You Thinking About, Baby?"
September 1931	"Roll on, Mississippi, Roll on"
September 1931	"Wrap Your Troubles in Dreams"
September 1931	"Honeymoon Lane"
September 1931	"I Can't Do Without You" ( with chorus)
18 September 1931	"Time Alone Will Tell"
18 September 1931	"When the Waltz Was Through"
18 September 1931	"Sing Another Chorus, Please"
18 September 1931	"Sweet and Lovely"
c. late September 1931	"By the River Sainte Marie"
c. late September 1931	"I'm Thru' with Love"
c. late September 1931	"Hang Out the Stars in Indiana"
c. late September 1931	"Just One More Chance"
2 October 1931	"Looking for You"
2 October 1931	"Kiss Me Goodnight"
2 October 1931	"Song of Happiness"
7 October 1931	"Just One More Chance"
7 October 1931	"Smile, Darn Ya, Smile"
7 October 1931	"That's What I Like About You"
7 October 1931	"You Forgot Your Gloves"
7 October 1931	"Take it from Me (I'm Taking to You)"
16 October 1931	"Yes, Yes (My Baby Said Yes)"
16 October 1931	"You Call It Madness (But I Call It Love)"
16 October 1931	"I Found a Million Dollar Baby (in a Five and Ten Cent Store)"
16 October 1931	"Look in the Looking-Glass"
19 October 1931	"There's a Time and Place for Everything"
29 October 1931	"Sweet and Lovely"
31 October 1931	"Who Am I?"
31 October 1931	"Linda"
31 October 1931	"Down Sunnyside Lane"
31 October 1931	"This Is the Day of Days"
5 November 1931	"This Is the Missus"
5 November 1931	"Over the Blue"
5 November 1931	"'Neath the Spell of Monte Carlo"
5 November 1931	"Life Is Just a Bowl of Cherries"
14 November 1931	"Got a Date with an Angel"
14 November 1931	"Guilty"
14 November 1931	"Twentieth Century Blues"
November 1931	"Looking for You"
November 1931	"That's What I Like About You"
November 1931	"Got a Date with an Angel"
November 1931	"The Way with Every Sailor"
November 1931	"Who Do You Love?"
November 1931	"Over the Blue"
November 1931	"Lies"
November 1931	"Rio de Janeiro"
November 1931	"Linda"
November 1931	"Dear, When I Met You"
1 December 1931	"I Can't Get Mississippi off My Mind"
1 December 1931	"Hold My Hand"
2 December 1931	"Yes, Yes (My Baby Said Yes)"
2 December 1931	"You Call It Madness (But I Call It Love)"
2 December 1931	"Nobody's Sweetheart"
2 December 1931	"Guilty"
4 December 1931	"Pied Piper of Hamelin"
8 December 1931	"Eleven More Months and Ten More Days"
8 December 1931	"Foolish Facts"
9 December 1931	"Eleven More Months and Ten More Days"
9 December 1931	"Foolish Facts"
19 December 1931	"I Was True" (with chorus)
19 December 1931	"One Little Quarrel"
30 December 1931	"The Longer That You Linger in Virginia"
30 December 1931	"If I Didn't Have You"
c. 5 January 1932	"Mona Lisa"
c. 5 January 1932	"Hold My Hand"
c. 5 January 1932	"Whispering"
c. 5 January 1932	"Dinah"
7 January 1932	"There's Something in Your Eyes"
8 January 1932	"Put Your Little Arms Around Me"
8 January 1932	"Meet Me Tonight in the Cowshed" (dialogue with Leonard Henry)
8 January 1932	"By the Fireside"
8 January 1932	"Must It End Like This?"
c. 13 January 1932	"A Faded Summer Love"
c. 13 January 1932	"You Didn't Know the Music (And I Didn't Know the Words)"
14 January 1932	"Actions Speak Louder Than Words"
14 January 1932	"One Little Quarrel" (with Anona Winn)
21 January 1932	"Prisoner of Love"
21 January 1932	"You Didn't Know the Music"
21 January 1932	"To Be Worthy of You"
21 January 1932	"Jig Time"
21 January 1932	"You're the Kind of a Baby for Me"
28 January 1932	"If Anything Happened to You"
28 January 1932	"In London on a Night Like This"
c. January 1932	"Falling in Love"
c. January 1932	"You Call It Madness (But I Call It Love)"
c. January 1932	"I Idolise My Baby's Eyes"
c. January 1932	"Life Is Just a Bowl of Cherries"
4 February 1932	"Adios"
12 February 1932	"Sweetheart in My Dreams Tonight"
12 February 1932	"It's Great to Be in Love"
12 February 1932	"Blues in My Heart"
16 February 1932	"Whistling Waltz"
16 February 1932	"Sweetheart in My Dreams Tonight"
16 February 1932	"Save the Last Dance for Me"
18 February 1932	"Granny's Photo Album"
18 February 1932	"Kiss by Kiss" (with The Carlyle Cousins)
18 February 1932	"The Night You Gave Me Back the Ring" (with The Carlyle Cousins)
18 February 1932	"Only Me Knows Why"
22 February 1932	"Concentratin' (On You)"
22 February 1932	"Minnie the Moocher" (with Lew Stone & Bill Harty)
22 February 1932	"Kicking the Gong Around" (Al Bowlly speaks the part of a Chinese)
3 March 1932	"There's a Ring Around the Moon"
3 March 1932	"With Love in My Heart"
5 March 1932	"With Love in My Heart"
5 March 1932	"Take Away the Moon"
5 March 1932	"We'll Be Together Again"
5 March 1932	"Tell Tales"
7 March 1932	"My Sweet Virginia"
7 March 1932	"If I Have to Go on Without You"
7 March 1932	"Kiss by Kiss"
7 March 1932	"Goodnight, Moon"
15 March 1932	"All of Me"/"Save the Last Dance for Me"
15 March 1932	"One More Kiss"/"By the Fireside"
22 March 1932	"She Didn't Say Yes" (as one of a trio)
22 March 1932	"Goodnight, Vienna"
22 March 1932	"Living in Clover"
24 March 1932	"The King Was in the Counting-House"
24 March 1932	"Goopy Geer"
24 March 1932	"Sailing on the Robert E. Lee"
1 April 1932	"Was That the Human Thing to Do?"/"Now That You're Gone"
1 April 1932	"Goodnight, Vienna"/"My Sweet Virginia"
7 April 1932	"Goodnight, Vienna"
7 April 1932	"Give Me a Tune"
7 April 1932	"Living in Clover"
13 April 1932	"Somebody Loves You"
13 April 1932	"I'm for You a Hundred Per Cent"
13 April 1932	"Can't We Talk It Over?"
13 April 1932	"When We're Alone"
20 April 1932	"Can't We Talk It Over?"/"Just Humming Along"
20 April 1932	"Auf Wiedersehen, My Dear"/"Rain on the Roof"
21 April 1932	"With All My Love and Kisses"
21 April 1932	"We've Got the Moon and Sixpence"
4 May 1932	"Lovable"
4 May 1932	"Love, You Funny Thing"
4 May 1932	"Getting Sentimental"
11 May 1932	"Snuggled on Your Shoulder"
11 May 1932	"When We're Alone"
11 May 1932	"What Makes You So Adorable?"
19 May 1932	"You've Got What Gets Me"
19 May 1932	"I Got Rhythm"
19 May 1932	"Put That Sun Back in the Sky"
1 June 1932	"Good Evening"
1 June 1932	"My Sunny Monterey"
8 June 1932	"Good Evening"
8 June 1932	"The Echo of a Song"
8 June 1932	"Dreams That Don't Grow Old"
10 June 1932	"The Echo of a Song"
10 June 1932	"It's Always Goodbye"
10 June 1932	"Lullaby of the Leaves"
10 June 1932	"Gone Forever"
10 June 1932	"What Makes You So Adorable?"
29 November 1932	"Junk Man Blues" (with Nat Gonella and chorus)
29 November 1932	"Balloons"
29 November 1932	"My Woman"
2 December 1932	"You'll Always Be My Sweetheart"
23 December 1932	"What More Can I Ask?"
23 December 1932	"Brighter Than the Sun"
23 December 1932	"Ich Liebe Dich, My Dear"
23 December 1932	"Lying in the Hay"
10 January 1933	"Little Nell" (Al Bowlly speaks the part of the villain.)
10 January 1933	"A Letter to My Mother (A Brivele der Mama)" (in Yiddish)
12 January 1933	"A Little Street Where Old Friends Meet"
12 January 1933	"Lying in the Hay"
12 January 1933	"Wanderer"
12 January 1933	"Just an Echo in the Valley"
27 January 1933	"A Letter to My Mother (A Brivele der Mama)" (in Yiddish)
27 January 1933	"What More Can I Ask?"
27 January 1933	"In Santa Lucia"
27 January 1933	"Please Handle with Care"
27 January 1933	"The World Is So Small"
27 January 1933	"Mediterranean Madness"
31 January 1933	"Butterflies in The Rain"
31 January 1933	"A Letter to My Mother"
31 January 1933	"Play, Fiddle, Play"
7 February 1933	"Look What You've Done"
7 February 1933	"Standing on the Corner"
7 February 1933	"Poor Me, Poor You"
7 February 1933	"Have You Ever Been Lonely?"
7 February 1933	"Wheezy Anna"
7 February 1933	"Love Tales"
1 August 1933	"Isn't It Heavenly?"
15 September 1933	"Blue Prelude"
15 September 1933	"Adorable"
18 September 1933	"Mademoiselle"
18 September 1933	"How Could We Be Wrong?"
19 September 1933	"It's Bad for Me"
19 September 1933	"Trouble in Paradise"
19 September 1933	"Oh! Johanna"
12 October 1933	"Snow Ball"
12 October 1933	"Dinner at Eight"
12 October 1933	"Experiment"
12 October 1933	"Weep No More, My Baby"
12 October 1933	"Love Locked out"
12 October 1933	"Happy and Contented" (with Eve Becke)
16 October 1933	"Night and Day"
16 October 1933	"Love Locked Out"
18 October 1933	"From Me to You"
24 October 1933	"Don't Change"
24 October 1933	"The Day You Came Along"
24 October 1933	"Thanks"
27 October 1933	"Goodnight, Little Girl of My Dreams"
27 October 1933	"Thanks"
27 October 1933	"My Hat's on the Side of My Head"
3 November 1933	"How Could We Be Wrong?"
3 November 1933	"Experiment"
9 November 1933	"Hand in Hand"
9 November 1933	"And So Goodbye"
9 November 1933	"This Is Romance"
13 November 1933	"Fancy Our Meeting"
13 November 1933	"Lover, Come Back to Me"
29 November 1933	"Song Without Words"
29 November 1933	"When You Were the Girl on the Scooter" (with Dawn Davis)
1 December 1933	"Weep no More, My Baby"
1 December 1933	"Close Your Eyes"
1 December 1933	"Lew Stone Favourites (Ten-Thirty Tuesday Night) – Part 1" (Al Bowlly sings a chorus of "Minnie the Moocher" with Tiny Winters and Bill Harty.)
1 December 1933	"Lew Stone Favourites (Ten-Thirty Tuesday Night) – Part 2" (Al Bowlly sings a chorus of "Brother, Can You Spare a Dime?")
7 December 1933	"My Song Goes 'Round the World"
7 December 1933	"Oceans of Time"
7 December 1933	"Close Your Eyes"
20 December 1933	"On a Steamer Coming over"
20 December 1933	"Did You Ever See a Dream Walking?"
20 December 1933	"You Ought to See Sally on Sunday"
29 December 1933	"Eadie Was a Lady"
29 December 1933	"Who'll Buy an Old Gold Ring?"
29 December 1933	"Dark Clouds"
4 January 1934	"Everything I Have Is Yours"
4 January 1934	"That's Me Without You"
9 January 1934	"Louisiana Hayride"
1 February 1934	"Unless"
1 February 1934	"Have a Heart"
1 February 1934	"Who Walks in When I Walk out?"
15 February 1934	"Faint Harmony"
15 February 1934	"Lullaby in Blue"
15 February 1934	"Gosh! I Must Be Falling in Love"
15 February 1934	"Wagon Wheels"
15 February 1934	"Coffee in the Morning (Kisses in the Night)"
15 February 1934	"Vamp till Ready"
21 February 1934	"Over on the Sunny Side"
21 February 1934	"Wagon Wheels"
12 March 1934	"Not Bad"
12 March 1934	"What Now?"
16 March 1934	"In a Shelter from a Shower"
23 March 1934	"Because It's Love"
23 March 1934	"Mauna Loa"
5 April 1934	"You Have Taken My Heart"
5 April 1934	"One Morning in May"
5 April 1934	"You Oughta Be in Pictures"
9 April 1934	"True"
9 April 1934	"The Very Thought of You"
9 April 1934	"You Oughta Be in Pictures"
9 April 1934	"Little Dutch Mill"
18 April 1934	"Wonder Bar – Film Selection Part1" (Al Bowlly sings a chorus of "Wonder Bar" and "Goin' to Heaven on a Mule")
18 April 1934	"Wonder Bar – Film Selection Part 2" (Al Bowlly sings a chorus of "Don't Say Goodnight" and "Wonder Bar")
21 April 1934	"The Old Covered Bridge"
21 April 1934	"Little Dutch Mill"
21 April 1934	"The Very Thought of You"
24 April 1934	"You're My Thrill"
24 April 1934	"Melody in Spring"
25 April 1934	"What Is There to Take Its Place?"
25 April 1934	"Lonely Feet"
25 April 1934	"Ending with a Kiss"
27 April 1934	"She Loves Me Not"
27 April 1934	"After All, You're All I'm After"
11 July 1934	"All I Do Is Dream of You"
26 September 1934	"It's All Forgotten Now"
12 January 1935	"Blue Moon"
12 January 1935	"In a Blue and Pensive Mood"
12 January 1935	"A Little White Gardenia"
12 January 1935	"You and the Night and the Music"
9 February 1935	"Soon"
9 February 1935	"Clouds"
9 February 1935	"Down by the River"
9 March 1935	"Flowers for Madame"
15 March 1935	"My Melancholy Baby"
15 March 1935	"Everything's Been Done Before"
15 March 1935	"You Opened My Eyes"
15 March 1935	"Basin Street Blues"
10 May 1935	"Paris in the Spring"
10 May 1935	"Bon Jour, Mam'selle"
8 June 1935	"Top Hat, White Tie and Tails" (with Ray Noble & The Freshmen)
10 June 1935	"Piccolino"
1O June 1935	"St. Louis Blues"
20 July 1935	"Why Dream?"
20 July 1935	"Why Stars Come out at Night"
20 July 1935	"I Wished on the Moon"
18 September 1935	"Roll Along, Prairie Moon"
18 September 1935	"Red Sails in the Sunset"
14 November 1935	"I'm the Fellow Who Loves You" (with The Freshmen)
14 November 1935	"Where Am I?"
14 November 1935	"Dinner for One, Please James"
9 December 1935	"With All My Heart"
9 December 1935	"I Built a Dream One Day"
9 December 1935	"Somebody Ought to Be Told"
9 December 1935	"A Beautiful Lady in Blue"
23 January 1936	"Let Yourself Go" (with The Freshmen)
23 January 1936	"Let's Face the Music and Dance"
23 January 1936	"If You Love Me"
19 March 1936	"Yours Truly Is Truly Yours"
19 March 1936	"Moonlight in Hilo"
19 March 1936	"The Touch of Your Lips"
19 March 1936	"Blazin' the Trail to My Home"
25 May 1936	"Empty Saddles"
25 May 1936	"Big Chief De Sota" (with Sterling Bose)
25 May 1936	"But Definitely"
25 May 1936	"When I'm With You"
24 August 1936	"Ray Noble Medley – Part 1" (Al Bowlly sings a chorus of "The Touch of Your Lips"
24 August 1936	"Ray Noble Medley – Part 2" (Al Bowlly sings a chorus of "Goodnight, Sweetheart"
25 September 1936	"Easy to Love"
25 September 1936	"I've Got You Under My Skin"
25 September 1936	"Let's Call a Heart a Heart"
25 September 1936	"One, Two, Button Your Shoe"
16 October 1936	"Now"
16 October 1936	"Little Old Lady"
16 October 1936	"There's Something in the Air"
16 October 1936	"Where the Lazy River Goes By"
7 December 1936	"You Were There"
19 June 1937	"Carelessly"
19 June 1937	"On a Little Dream Ranch"
5 July 1937	"Blue Hawaii"
5 July 1937	"Sweet Is the Word for You"
17 July 1937	"Le Touquet"
17 July 1937	"Vieni, Vieni"
17 July 1937	"Smile When You Say Goodbye"
17 July 1937	"Hometown"
3 December 1937	"I Can Dream, Can't I?"
3 December 1937	"Half Moon on the Hudson"
3 December 1937	"Every Day's a Holiday"
3 December 1937	"Sweet as a Song"
3 December 1937	"Outside of Paradise"
3 December 1937	"Sweet Stranger"
29 December 1937	"Bei Mir Bist Du Schoen"
29 December 1937	"There's a Gold Mine in the Sky"
29 December 1937	"Kiss Me Goodnight"
4 January 1938	"Bei Mir Bist Du Schoen"
4 January 1938	"Marie"
13 January 1938	"The Lonesome Trail Ain't Lonesome Any More"
13 January 1938	"It's a Long Long Way to Your Heart"
13 January 1938	"Souvenir of Love"
13 January 1938	"Trusting My Luck"
14 January 1938	"Rosalie – Selection Part 1" (Al Bowlly sings a chorus of "Rosalie")
14 January 1938	"Rosalie – Selection Part 2" (Al Bowlly sings a chorus of "In the Still of the Night")
20 January 1938	"Rosalie"
20 January 1938	"In the Still of the Night"
20 January 1938	"Once in a While"
2 February 1938	"You're a Sweetheart"
2 February 1938	"The Pretty Little Patchwork Quilt"
4 February 1938	"I Double Dare You"
4 February 1938	"The Girl in the Alice Blue Gown"
4 February 1938	"Little Drummer Boy"
4 February 1938	"You're a Sweetheart"
4 March 1938	"Something to Sing About"
4 March 1938	"In My Little Red Book"
21 March 1938	"Sweet Genevieve"
21 March 1938	"In My Little Red Book"
21 March 1938	"Moonlight on the Highway"
21 March 1938	"Have You Ever Been in Heaven?"
1 April 1938	"Sweet as a Song" (with The Five Herons)
1 April 1938	"Sweet Someone" (with The Five Herons)
21 April 1938	"By an Old Pagoda"
21 April 1938	"Mama, I Wanna Make Rhythm"
21 April 1938	"In Santa Margherita"
21 April 1938	"Ti-Pi-Tin"
25 May 1938	"Goodnight, Angel"
25 May 1938	"When the Organ Played "Oh, Promise Me""
13 June 1938	"When the Organ Played "Oh, Promise Me""
13 June 1938	"Somebody's Thinking of You Tonight"
13 June 1938	"My Heaven on Earth"
1 July 1938	"The Blackpool Walk"
1 July 1938	"The Girl in the Upstairs Flat"
1 July 1938	"When Granny Wore Her Crinoline"
1 July 1938	"I'm Saving the Last Waltz for You"
12 August 1938	"Down and Out Blues" (with Sid Colin)
12 August 1938	"Little Lady Make-Believe"
12 August 1938	"I'm Sorry I Didn't Say I'm Sorry"
12 August 1938	"You Couldn't Be Cuter"
12 August 1938	"Just Let Me Look at You"
15 August 1938	"The Red Maple Leaves"
15 August 1938	"Music, Maestro, Please"
15 August 1938	"I Won't Tell a Soul"
15 August 1938	"Say Goodnight to Your Old-Fashioned Mother"
9 September 1938	"My Heart Is Taking Lessons"
9 September 1938	"On the Sentimental Side"
27 September 1938	"Now it Can Be Told"
27 September 1938	"On the Sentimental Side"
28 September 1938	"Proud of You"
3 October 1938	"Everyone Should Have a Sweetheart"
3 October 1938	"The Frog on the Water-Lily"
14 October 1938	"In a Little Toy Sail Boat"
14 October 1938	"Small Fry"
11 November 1938	"Never Break a Promise"
11 November 1938	"When Mother Nature Sings Her Lullaby"
11 November 1938	"Penny Serenade"
11 November 1938	"Heart and Soul"
11 November 1938	"When Mother Nature Sings Her Lullaby"
11 November 1938	"There's Rain in My Eyes"
11 November 1938	"Al Bowlly Remembers – Part 1" ("Lover, Come Back to Me"/"Dancing in the Dark")
11 November 1938	"Al Bowlly Remembers – Part 2" ("I'm Gonna Sit Right Down and Write Myself a Letter"/"Auf Wiedersehen, My Dear")
28 November 1938	"All Ashore"
28 November 1938	"Penny Serenade"
28 November 1938	"Any Broken Hearts to Mend?"
28 November 1938	"Georgia's Gotta Moon"
3 December 1938	"Two Sleepy People"
3 December 1938	"Is That the Way to Treat a Sweetheart?"
3 December 1938	"Colorado Sunset"
3 December 1938	"While a Cigarette Was Burning"
16 December 1938	"Any Broken Hearts to Mend?"
16 December 1938	"Summer's End"
16 December 1938	"My Own"
16 December 1938	"You're as Pretty as a Picture"
10 January 1939	"They Say"
10 January 1939	"If Ever a Heart Was in the Right Place"
10 January 1939	"One Day When We Were Young"
10 January 1939	"I'm in Love with Vienna"
3 February 1939	"Grandma Said"
3 February 1939	"Deep in a Dream"
3 February 1939	"You're a Sweet Little Headache"
8 February 1939	"I'm Madly in Love with You"
14 February 1939	"Romany"
14 February 1939	"Lonely"
14 February 1939	"I Miss You in the Morning"
14 February 1939	"Violin in Vienna"
7 March 1939	"The Same Old Story"
7 March 1939	"Could Be"
7 March 1939	"Between a Kiss and a Sigh"
4 April 1939	"To Mother with Love"
4 April 1939	"Thanks for Everything"
4 April 1939	"I Miss You in the Morning"
5 May 1939	"Small Town"
5 May 1939	"What Do You Know About Love?"
11 May 1939	"What Do You Know About Love?"
11 May 1939	"Hey Gypsy, Play Gypsy"
11 May 1939	"South of the Border"
11 May 1939	"Dark Eyes"
8 June 1939	"The Waves of the Ocean Are Whisp'ring Goodnight"
5 October 1939	"Moon Love"
5 October 1939	"Au Revoir but Not Goodbye"
5 October 1939	"A Man and His Dream"
5 October 1939	"Ridin' Home"
21 December 1939	"Bella Bambina"
21 December 1939	"Over the Rainbow"
21 December 1939	"Somewhere in France with You"
21 December 1939	"Give Me My Ranch"
15 February 1940	"It's a Lovely Day Tomorrow"
15 February 1940	"Careless"
1 March 1940	"Chatterbox"
1 March 1940	"When You Wish upon a Star"
1 March 1940	"Turn on the Old Music Box"
7 March 1940	"Dreaming"
7 March 1940	"A Little Rain Must Fall"
7 March 1940	"When You Wear Your Sunday Blue"
7 March 1940	"Walkin' Thru' Mockin' Bird Lane"
26 March 1940	"Who's Taking You Home Tonight?"
26 March 1940	"Arm in Arm"
26 March 1940	"There's a Boy Coming Home on Leave"
26 March 1940	"My Capri Serenade"
24 April 1940	"Blow, Blow, Thou Winter Wind"
24 April 1940	"It Was a Lover and His Lass"
4 May 1940	"Make Love with a Guitar"/ "When I Dream of Home" (duet with Jimmy Mesene)
4 May 1940	"Make-Believe Island"/ "The Woodpecker Song" (duet with Jimmy Mesene)
18 July 1940	"Turn Your Money in Your Pocket"/ "I'll Never Smile Again"/ "We'll Go Smiling Along" (duet with Jimmy Mesene)
18 July 1940	"I'm Stepping Out with a Memory Tonight"/ "I Haven't Time to Be a Millionaire" (duet with Jimmy Mesene)
6 December 1940	"Ferry Boat Serenade" (duet with Jimmy Mesene)
6 December 1940	"Only Forever" (duet with Jimmy Mesene)
2 April 1941	"Nicky The Greek (Has Gone)" (duet with Jimmy Mesene)
2 April 1941	"When That Man Is Dead and Gone" (duet with Jimmy Mesene)
