= Petite Suite =

Petite Suite may refer to the following musical compositions:

- Petite Suite (Bartók)
- Petite Suite, an excerpt arrangement from Jeux d'enfants (Bizet)
- Petite Suite (Borodin)
- Petite Suite (Debussy)
