= Blues in My Heart =

"Blues in My Heart" is a 1931 jazz standard. It was written by Benny Carter and Irving Mills.

== Cover Versions ==
- Mildred Bailey - recorded on September 15, 1931 for Brunswick Records (catalog No. 6190).
- Fletcher Henderson and His Orchestra (1931).
- Eubie Blake and His Orchestra (September 1931)
- Ray Noble and His New Mayfair Dance Orchestra (vocal by Al Bowlly) recorded on February 12, 1932. (Al Bowlly discography)
- Lee Wiley - for the album A Touch of the Blues (1958).
- Ace Cannon recorded a version on his debut 1962 album Tuff Sax.

== See also ==
- List of jazz standards
