= Lies (1931 song) =

"Lies" is a popular song with music by Harry Barris and lyrics by George E. Springer. It was published in 1931.

The song was originally recorded in the period 1931–32 by:

- Gus Arnheim and his orchestra (vocal by Dave Marshall), recorded October 29, 1931, released by Victor Records as catalog number 22853, with the flip side "Put Your Little Arms Around Me"
- Gene Austin (with the Ben Pollack orchestra), recorded November 10, 1931, and released by Perfect Records as catalog number 15542, with the flip side "I'm Sorry, Dear"
- Bing Crosby - sang it on his radio show Bing Crosby - The Cremo Singer on December 15, 1931.
- Henry Halstead
- Benny Krueger and his orchestra (vocal by Frank Sylvano), recorded January 21, 1932, and released by Brunswick as catalog number 6246B, with the flip side "Was That the Human Thing to Do?"

It has since been recorded by many other singers, including Perry Como for RCA Victor, Snooky Lanson for London, Julia Lee and Her Boyfriends for Capitol, and Jack Pleis and His Orchestra for Decca Records (United States).

The Como recording was made on November 4, 1952 and released by RCA Victor Records as catalog number 20-5064 (78 rpm) and 47-5064 (45 rpm). The flip side of the single was "Don't Let the Stars Get in Your Eyes," a bigger hit, but this side did reach #30 on the Billboard charts. The same recording was also released in the United Kingdom by His Master's Voice as catalog number B-10431 in March, 1953, with the flip side "I Confess." It was also included in the 1956 LP album A Sentimental Date With Perry Como (RCA catalog number LPM-1177), and on several EP records.

The Lee recording was recorded August 23, 1946 and released by Capitol as catalog number 308, with the flip side "Gotta Gimme What'cha Got".

The Pleis recording was released by Decca in 1955 as catalog number 29664, with the flip side "Hey There".
