= Petite Suite (Bartók) =

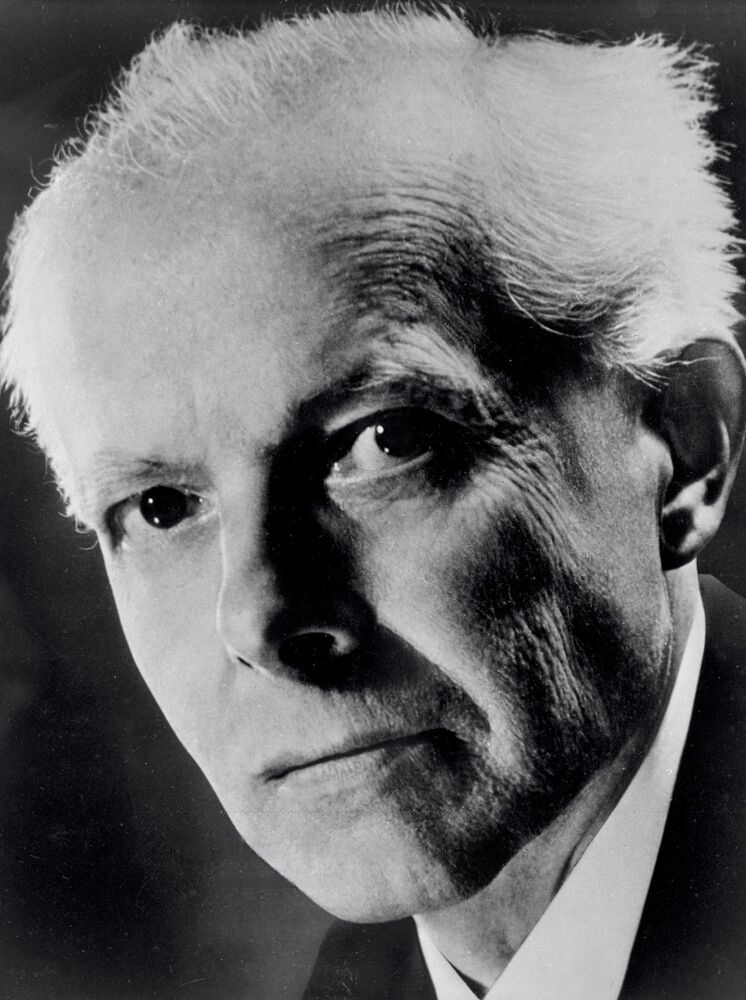
Béla Bartók in 1943

Petite Suite, Sz. 105, BB 113 is a reduction for piano of six of Béla Bartók's 44 Duos for Two Violins, arranged by the composer in 1936.

== Structure ==
This six-movement work is a collection of excerpts from the 44 duos above mentioned. The movement list is as follows:

1. Lassú (slow tune), which comes from No. 28: Bánkodás (sorrow)
2. Máramarosi tánc (Wallachian dance), which comes from No. 32: Máramarosi tánc (dance from Máramaros)
3. Forgatós (whirling dance), which comes from No. 38: Forgatós (Romanian whirling dance)
4. Pengetós (quasi pizzicato), which comes from No. 43: Pizzicato
5. Oroszos (Ruthenian dance), which comes from No. 16: Burleszk (burlesque)
6. Dudás (bagpipes), which comes from No. 36: Szól a duda (bagpipes)

== Notable recordings ==
Notable recordings of the piano reduction include:

Piano Solo	Record Company	Year of Recording	Format
György Sándor	CBS Masterworks	1987	CD
Jenő Jandó	Naxos Records	2005	CD
