= Sedbergh People's Hall =

Village hall in Sedbergh, Cumbria, England

Coordinates: 54.32459°N 2.53062°W

Sedbergh People's Hall is a village hall in Sedbergh, unique because it was built by the people, for the people. It was built in 1956.

== Land and lease ==
The land on which the People's Hall stands, on Howgill Lane, is owned by Sedbergh Parish Council under a conveyance of 16 October 1929. The leasehold for the site of the People's Hall and adjacent land is vested in the Trustees of Sedbergh People's Hall, under a 99-year lease dated 12 December 1956. A supplemental lease dated 22 October 1985, was granted to allow the kitchen and changing room extension. The lease will expire in 2055. The Hall is governed by a Declaration of Trust dated 1 June 1959.

The Trust Deed states that: The property shall be held upon trust for the purposes of a Village Hall for the use of the inhabitants of the Parish of Sedbergh ... without distinction of sex or political, religious or other opinions and, in particular, for use for meetings lectures and classes and for other forms of recreation and leisure time occupation with the object of improving the conditions of life for the said inhabitants.

== The first committee and event ==
The first minute book starts with minutes of a public meeting held to consider the question of a People's Hall for Sedbergh on 12 November 1945. The committee of fifteen elected by ballot at that meeting were: JH Bruce Lockhart, Willan Batty, ACG Hall, J Johnson, JP Lowis, EH Martin, HD Mountain, Revd Ellison, Miss Wadeson, J Dawson Jnr, E Dinsdale, W Downhill, Miss Sedgwick, Miss Trotter and E Hall.

The first big fundraising event, a production of Rebecca, by the Sedbergh Theatre on the stage of Powell Hall, raised £1263-17-0. Other events included an auction sale organised by the Chamber of Trade, a rummage sale organised by Miss H Hague, a bazaar in Powell Hall which raised over £1000 and a Grand National Night. In addition, Sedbergh School raised nearly £100 with a production of the Yeoman of Guard.

== The opening ==
The Hall was opened on 24 November 1956, facing considerable debt despite 11 years of fundraising.

A leading article in the Westmorland Gazette of 17 November 1956 reads:

When the People’s Hall opens next week it will mark the end of a long chapter of trials and tribulations for those who, over the last decade, have been fighting hard to bring the scheme to fruition. Now that the hall is built it is encouraging to the People’s Hall Committee to find that many of the opponents of the scheme in years gone by are anxious to make the venture a success. Whatever the merits or otherwise of the case, the success of the hall depends on Sedbergh people who will stand to benefit most when the hall plays a major role in the community life of the district. It is regrettable that the hall should open with a considerable debt to face. But there lies the challenge. If the energy that has been deployed in debate can now be diverted to money-raising the scheme will quickly be a solvent Sedbergh amenity.

The gross cost was £9000 and the preparation of the site was £1,900. A government grant of £2,500 had been received and a loan of £1,000 was raised locally. This, with another £500, was still owed. The official opening ceremony was performed by the Reverend FM Cubbon. The key of the main door was handed to Mr Cubbon by Sergeant S Short, of the West Riding Constabulary, on behalf of the people of Sedbergh. The Chairman of West Riding County Council, and representatives of the building firm were present.

During the week following the opening the committee continued fundraising towards the cost of the building. The opening play, The Quiet Weekend, made a profit of £103. There was also a dance, a whist drive and a concert party.

== Architecture ==
The Hall, an illustrated article, appeared in Timber Engineering of August 1957 describing the Kingston form of construction used and that four laminated timber arches of 36 ft span were incorporated in the community centre designed for the People's Hall Committee at Sedbergh, Yorkshire – an all-timber design.

== Current ==
The fortunes of the Hall have ebbed and flowed over the years since it was completed and it has seen additions and improvements. Now it stands on the verge of an ambitious rebuilding and refurbishment programme, and the present Trustees face fundraising challenges possibly relatively greater than their predecessors in 1945 as they take forward the vision and aims of Jack Dawson and his fellow-trustees of 1959.

The hall is a registered charity.
