= 44 Duos for Two Violins =

Compositions by Béla Bartók

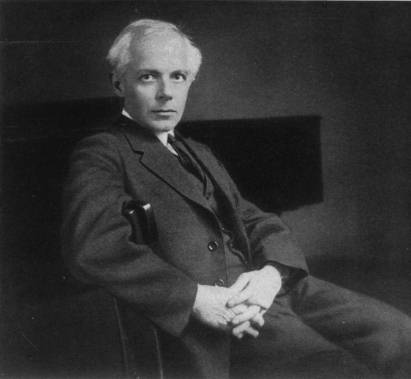
Béla Bartók in 1927

44 Duos for Two Violins (sometimes also entitled 44 Duets), Sz. 98, BB 104 is a series of duets composed in 1931 by Hungarian composer Béla Bartók.

== Composition ==
Béla Bartók did not intend this work to be played in performances, but rather to be useful as a work for young students. The work was commissioned by Erich Doflein, a German violinist and teacher, who asked Bartók if he would arrange some of the pieces from the For Children series. He composed other works in this period that were meant to be pedagogical, such as Mikrokosmos. This intention for educative works was exploited by the fact that he was a teacher himself, then he chose to write works for his pupils to play. Nevertheless, all songs and dances included in this series are based on folk music from many Eastern Europe countries, but harmonic and rhythmic freedom is evident throughout the whole piece.

In 1936, Bartók arranged 6 of these duos for piano, under the title Petite Suite.

== Structure ==
This work is divided in four books, and the series of pieces advances in difficulty. The first and the second book should suit a student with a basic level, while the third book would be for an intermediate level, and the fourth book for an advanced level.

Book I

1. Párosíto (Teasing Song)
2. Kalamajkó (Maypole Dance)
3. Menuetto
4. Szentivánéji (Midsummer Night Song)
5. Tót nóta (Slovakian Song) [1]
6. Magyar nóta (Hungarian Song) [1]
7. Oláh nóta (Wallachian Song)
8. Tót nóta (Slovakian Song) [2]
9. Játék (Play Song)
10. Rutén nóta (Ruthenian Song)
11. Gyermekrengetéskor (Cradle Song)
12. Szénagyűjtéskor (Hay Song)
13. Lakodalmas (Wedding Song)
14. Párnás tánc (Pillow Dance)

Book II

15. Katonanóta (Soldiers' Song)
16. Burleszk (Burlesque)
17. Menetelő nóta (Hungarian March) [1]
18. Menetelő nóta (Hungarian March) [2]
19. Mese (Fairy Tale)
20. Dal (A Rhythm Song)
21. Újévköszöntő (New Year's Greeting) [1]
22. Szunyogtánc (Mosquito Dance)
23. Mennyasszonybúcsútató (Bride's Farewell)
24. Tréfás nóta (Comic Song)
25. Magyar nóta (Hungarian Song) [2]

Book III

26. "Ugyan édes komámasszony..." (Teasing Song)
27. Sánta-tánc (Limping Dance)
28. Bánkódás (Sorrow)
29. Újévköszöntő (New Year's Greeting) [2]
30. Újévköszöntő (New Year's Greeting) [3]
31. Újévköszöntő (New Year's Greeting) [4]
32. Máramarosi tánc (Dance from Máramaros)
33. Ara táskor (Harvest Song)
34. Számláló nóta (Enumerating Song)
35. Rutén kolomejka (Ruthenian Kolomejka)
36. Szól a duda (Bagpipes)
  2. A 36 Sz. Változata (Variant of No. 36)

Book IV

37. Preludium és kanon (Prelude and Canon)
38. Forgatós (Romanian Whirling Dance)
39. Szerb tánc (Serbian Dance)
40. Oláh tánc (Wallachian Dance)
41. Scherzo
42. Arab dal (Arabian Dance)
43. Pizzicato
44. "Erdélyi" tánc (Transylvanian Dance)

Dissonant harmonies are present throughout the whole piece, but it is not until the eleventh piece that polytonality is introduced. This work is specially well known for its rhythm, its dissonances, its canons and inversions, and its variety in using the whole gamut of the violin.
