= Don't Take My Boop-Oop-A-Doop Away =

1931 song by Sammy Timberg

"Don't Take My Boop-Oop-A-Doop Away" is a song written by Sammy Timberg.

It was first recorded for the short film Musical Justice, with a vocal by Mae Questel. It was then used in the 1932 Betty Boop Talkartoons cartoon Boop-Oop-a-Doop. The chorus follows as:

You can feed me bread and water,
Or a great big bale of hay,
But don't take my boop-oop-a-doop away!;
You can say my voice is awful,
Or my songs are too risqué.
Oh, but don't take my boop-oop-a-doop away!,

== See also ==
- Musical Justice (1931)
- Boop-Oop-a-Doop
