= Rostislav Boyko =

Rostislav Boyko Ростислав Бойко
- Born: August 1, 1931; Leningrad, Russian SFSR, Soviet Union
- Died: November 18, 2002 (aged 71) Moscow, Russia
- Genres: Classical
- Occupations: Composer, conductor

Rostislav Grigoryevich Boyko (Note: Russian: Ростислав Григорьевич Бойко, romanized: Rostislav Grigoryevich Boyko, sometimes given as Rostislaw Grigorjewitsch Boiko) (1 August 1931 – 18 November 2002) was a Russian composer and conductor. He was principally active in both occupations within the area of choral music. He produced more than 100 choral works; most of which have been published and recorded. He also composed three symphonies, four operas, many art songs for solo voice, and some works for solo piano.

== Education and career ==
Boyko was born in Leningrad and educated at the St. Petersburg State Academic Capella (1939–1944) and the Moscow Choral School (1944–1950) before he pursued graduate studies at the Moscow Conservatory with Aram Khachaturian and Vladimir Pavlovič Stepanov. He graduated from the latter institution in 1957 with degrees in choral conducting and music composition.

Boyko was principally active as a choral composer, publishing 80 choral opuses before 1983. His choral music, often inspired by Russian folk songs and poetry, were championed by conductor Yevgeny Svetlanov who recorded many of his works. Particularly successful among his choral works are his settings of verses by Alexander Pushkin (1978) and his romances and songs set to poems by Sergei Yesenin (1969, 1972, 1976), Heinrich Heine (1974, 1976, 1982), and Avetik Isahakyan (1983). His Symphony No. 2 was given its United States premiere in 1990 by the Tucson Symphony Orchestra.

Boyko died in Moscow at the age of 71.
