= Yours Is My Heart Alone =

Aria

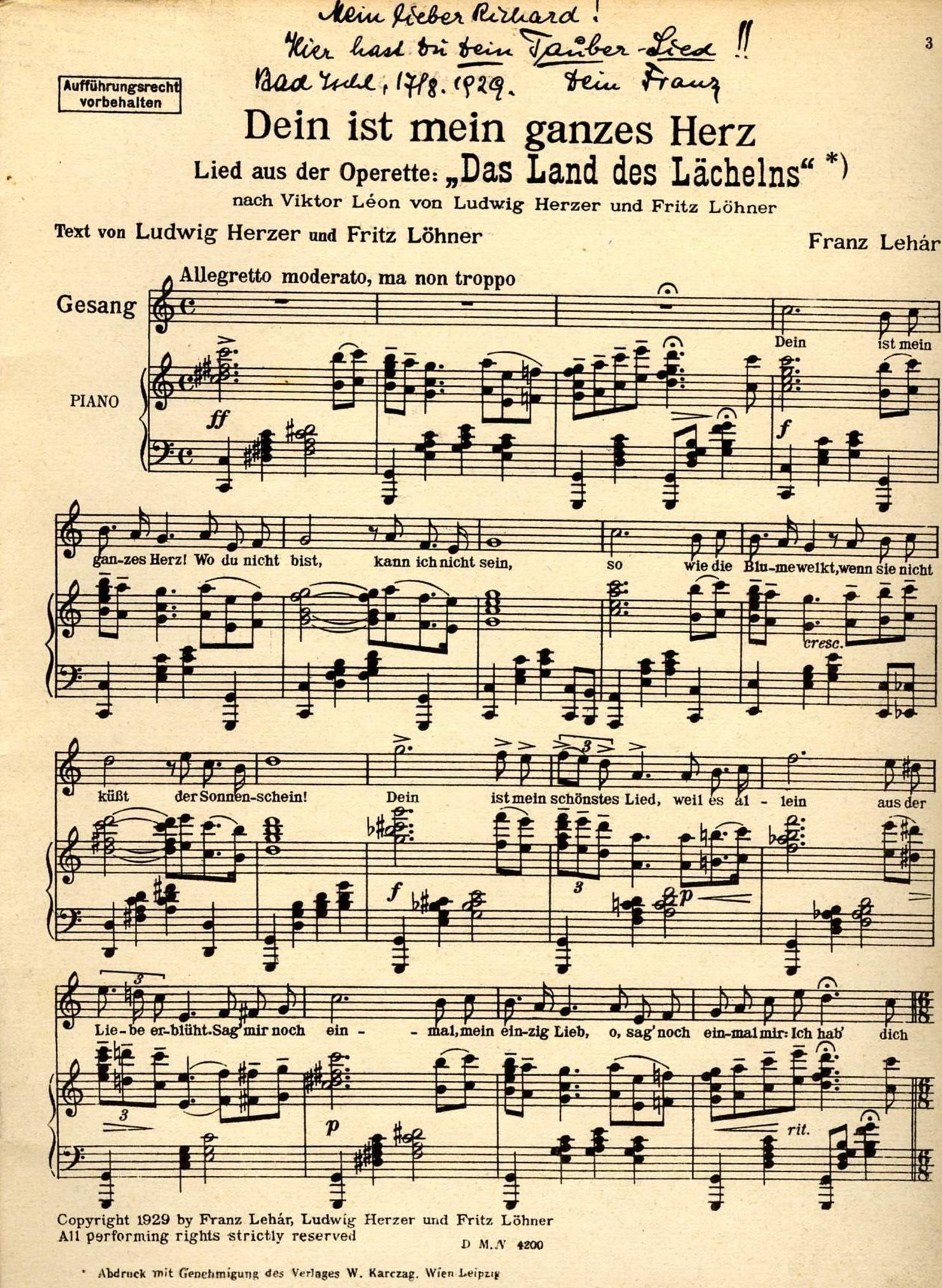
Sheet music with Franz Lehár's inscription to Richard Tauber, August 1929

"Yours Is My Heart Alone" or "You Are My Heart's Delight" (German: "Dein ist mein ganzes Herz") is an aria from the 1929 operetta The Land of Smiles (Das Land des Lächelns) with music by Franz Lehár and the libretto by Fritz Löhner-Beda and Ludwig Herzer. It was for many years associated with the tenor Richard Tauber, for whom it was written. The aria is sung by the character of Prince Sou-Chong in act 2. An American version of the show opened on Broadway in 1946 starring Tauber but it soon closed as Tauber had throat trouble.

The aria has been sung in Italian (as "Tu che m'hai preso il cuor" [You who have taken my heart]) by a few operatic tenors, notably Giuseppe Di Stefano, Mario Del Monaco, and Luciano Pavarotti.

== Composition ==
Lehár had composed parts of the song already in 1923 when the original version of the operetta premiered under the title Die gelbe Jacke (The Yellow Jacket). When Löhner-Beda re-arranged the operetta, he moved Prince Sou-Chong's passage from act 1 to act 2. With new lyrics, it has possibly become Lehár's most famous single song, popularised by Tauber, who sang it at almost every recital he gave, often as an encore. With Tauber's emigration to London in 1938, it became popular also in the English-speaking world with lyrics by Harry B. Smith, which had originally been written in 1931, and went on to become a staple of light music repertoire for tenor voice. It became a standard and has been covered by artists from other genres, like jazz, swing, big band, and pop music.

== Lyrics ==
Dein ist mein ganzes Herz!
Wo du nicht bist, kann ich nicht sein,
so, wie die Blume welkt,
wenn sie nicht küßt der Sonnenschein!
Dein ist mein schönstes Lied,
weil es allein aus der Liebe erblüht.
Sag' mir noch einmal, mein einzig Lieb,
o sag' noch einmal mir:
Ich hab' dich lieb!

Wohin ich immer gehe,
ich fühle deine Nähe.
Ich möchte deinen Atem trinken
und betend dir zu Füssen sinken,
dir, dir allein! Wie wunderbar
ist dein leuchtendes Haar!
Traumschön und sehnsuchtsbang
ist dein strahlender Blick.
Hör ich der Stimme Klang,
ist es so wie Musik.

Dein ist mein ganzes Herz!
...

You are my heart's delight,
And where you are, I long to be
You make my darkness bright,
When like a star you shine on me
Shine, then, my whole life through
Your life divine bids me hope anew
That dreams of mine may at last come true
And I shall hear you whisper,
"I love you."

In dreams when night is falling
I seem to hear you calling
For you have cast a net around me
And 'neath a magic spell hath bound me
Yours, yours alone
How wondrous fair is your beautiful hair
Bright as a summer sky
is the night in your eyes
Soft as a sparkling star
is the warmth of my love.

You are my heart's delight,
(repeat first verse)

Tu che m'hai preso il cuor
sarai per me il solo amor.
No, non ti scorderò,
vivrò per te, ti sognerò.
Te o nessuna mai più
ormai per me, come il sole sei tu,
lontan da te è morir d'amor
perchè sei tu che m'hai
rubato il cuor.

Ti vedo tra le rose,
ti dico tante cose.
se il vento lieve t'accarezza
un profumar di giovinezza
mi fai tremar!
La notte sogno tremando di te
quale incantesimo
il mio cuor sul tuo cuor
mentre si schiudono
le pupille tue d'or.

Tu che m'hai preso il cuor
...

== Notable recordings ==
As "Dein ist mein ganzes Herz"

- 1929 Richard Tauber – recorded October 3, 1929
- 1946 Lauritz Melchior
- 1985 Heinz Rudolf Kunze - Received Gold Status and was also a Top Ten hit in the German charts.
- 1990 Plácido Domingo – included in the live album The Three Tenors in Concert.
- Franco Bonisolli – live performance; interpolated a high D-flat at the end.
- José Carreras

As "You Are My Heart's Delight"

- 1929 Richard Tauber – Parlophone RO20107
- 1931 Roy Fox and His Band – vocal Al Bowlly – recorded August 18, 1931. (Al Bowlly discography)
- 1931 Richard Crooks
- 1941 Richard Tauber – Parlophone R.O.20500

As "Yours Is My Heart Alone"

- 1940 Bing Crosby – recorded March 22, 1940 with John Scott Trotter and His Orchestra.
- 1940 Tommy Dorsey and his Orchestra – recorded April 10, 1940 with vocal by Frank Sinatra.
- 1940 Glen Gray and The Casa Loma Orchestra – recorded February 27, 1940, vocal Kenny Sargent, for Decca Records (catalog 3053A). This reached the Billboard charts, peaking at No. 11 in an eight-week stay.
- 1940 Benny Goodman – recorded March 1, 1940 for Columbia Records (catalog No. 35445), vocal by Helen Forrest.
- 1940 Glenn Miller – recorded March 30, 1940, for Bluebird Records (catalog No. B-10728)
- 1954 Mario Lanza – included in his album The Student Prince and Other Great Musical Comedies.
- 1960 Mary Costa – Included on the Frank Sinatra Timex Show: Here's to the Ladies
- 1960 Ray Conniff – included in his album Concert in Rhythm, vol. 2.
- 1957 Jane Morgan – for her album Fascination.
- 1962 The Oscar Peterson Trio – for the album Affinity.

As "Tu che m'hai preso il cuor"

- Giuseppe Di Stefano
- Mario Del Monaco
- Luciano Pavarotti
