= Mary (I'm in Love with You) =

Song
- Published: 1931
- Genre: Foxtrot
- Songwriter(s): J. Fred Coots and Ozzie Nelson

Brunswick E37427
Sample of the 1931 recording by Ozzie Nelson & his Orchestra

"Mary (I'm in Love with You)"
As heard during the ending credits of The Adventures of Ozzie and Harriet episode "Ricky Goes to a Dance"

1931 sheet music cover featuring a portrait of Guy Lombardo

"Mary (I'm in Love with You)" is an American popular song of 1931, written by J. Fred Coots and Ozzie Nelson. Nelson and his orchestra recorded the song on November 25, 1931 (Brunswick E37427). The recording starts off straight and "sweet" but progresses into an early swing style. He sang:

Mary, what are we waiting for?
Each day I want you more and more
You'll always be the one girl for me
For Mary I'm in love with you

Other recordings include The High Hatters with a vocal refrain by Frank Luther, recorded on November 6, 1931 (Victor 22857).

An uptempo variation with a slightly different melody was the theme song for The Adventures of Ozzie and Harriet radio show, as well as the theme song for the ending credits of many episodes of the TV show.
