= Tomasz Bartkiewcz =

Polish composer and organist

Tomasz K. Bartkiewcz (September 4, 1865 – March 25, 1931) was a Polish composer and organist, co-founder of the Singer Circles Union (Związek Kół Śpiewackich).
