= Dorothy James =

American music educator and composer

Dorothy James (1 December 1901 – 1 December 1982) was an American music educator and composer.

James was born in Chicago, Illinois, and graduated from the Chicago Musical College and the American Conservatory of Music, where she studied with Louis Gruenberg for composition and Adolph Weidig for counterpoint. She continued her studies with Howard Hanson at Eastman School of Music, Healey Willan at the Toronto Conservatory, and Ernst Krenek at the University of Michigan. After completing her studies, she took a position in 1927 teaching music at Eastern Michigan University, then Michigan State Normal College, where she worked until retiring in 1968. She was awarded an honorary doctorate from the school in 1971.

== Works ==
James composed works for orchestra, chamber ensemble, solo instrument and voice. She also composed an opera and a number of song. Selected works include:

- Three Symphonic Fragments (1931) for orchestra
- Mutability (Text: Percy Bysshe Shelley)
- Paola and Francesca (1930–34) opera
- The Jumblies (Text: Edward Lear) 1935)
- Paul Bunyan (1938)
- Motif (1970)
- Patterns (1971)
