= Dirk Schäfer =

Dutch concert pianist and composer (1873–1931)

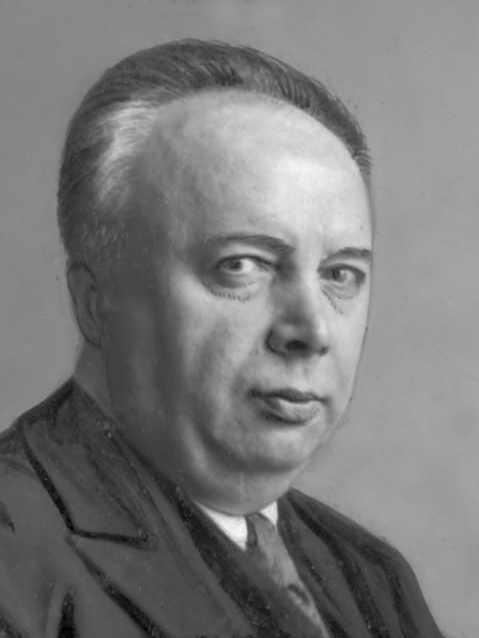
Dirk Schäfer (1931)

Dirk Schäfer (Rotterdam November 25, 1873 – Amsterdam February 16, 1931) was a Dutch concert pianist and composer. His compositions include piano pieces ("Sonate Inaugurale" Op. 9) and chamber music, such as his distinctly Brahmsian piano quintet in D flat (Opus 5) and his sonatas for violin and piano, Op. 11. He also wrote a "Javanese Rhapsody". He recorded performances of works by Chopin and Francois Couperin before his death.
