= I Found a Million Dollar Baby (in a Five and Ten Cent Store) =

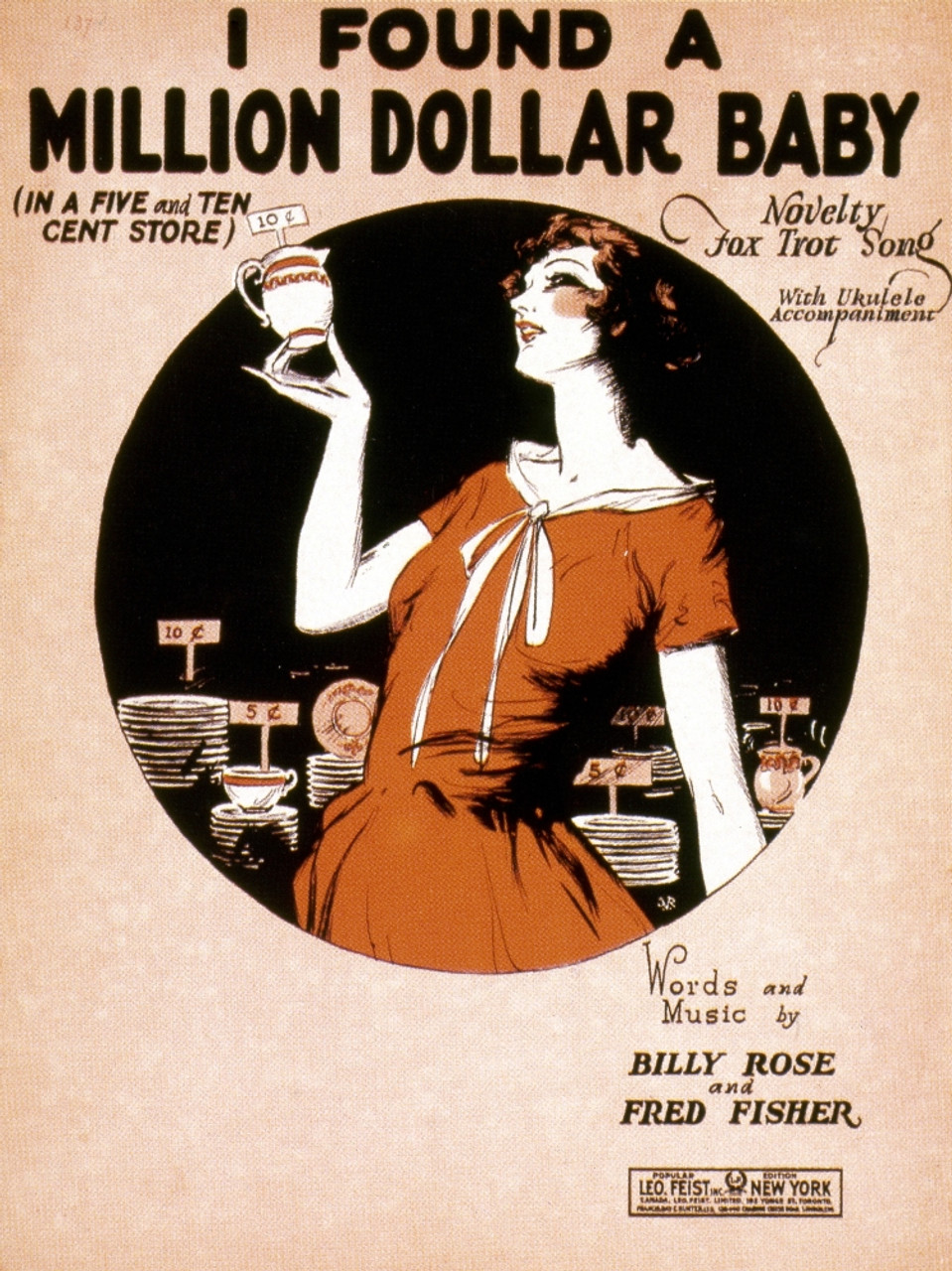
- Sheet music cover, 1926

Song by Fanny Brice
- Published: 1931, 1926 (lyrics with different music)
- Composer: Harry Warren
- Lyricists: Mort Dixon, Billy Rose

"I Found a Million Dollar Baby (in a Five and Ten Cent Store)" is a popular song.

The music was written by Harry Warren, the lyrics by Mort Dixon and Billy Rose. The song was published in 1931, though a song using the same title, with a similar lyric by Rose and different music, had been published five years earlier. It was introduced in the Broadway musical Billy Rose's Crazy Quilt, which opened in May, 1931, where it was sung by Fanny Brice.

Many versions of the song were recorded in 1931. The biggest hit was by Fred Waring's Pennsylvanians, with a vocal by Clare Hanlon, released by Victor Records as catalog number 22707. The next-most-popular version was by Bing Crosby, recorded on June 12, 1931 and released by Brunswick Records as catalog number 6128 and a version recorded by the Boswell Sisters and Victor Young's Orchestra also had some popularity. The song has since become a pop standard, recorded by many additional people (see below).

== 1926 Song By Billy Rose ==
Billy Rose first used the title for a 1926 song that had music by Fred Fisher. Rose wrote the lyric for the earlier song, which also described a man falling in love with a woman who sold china in a five and dime. (The 1931 lyric written largely by Mort Dixon, while using the same idea as the 1926 lyric, is not identical to that of the earlier song.) The 1926, though not a hit, was recorded for RCA Victor in 1926 by Canadian singer Henry Burr.

== Recorded versions of the 1931 Song ==
- Frank Auburn and his orchestra (recorded May 28, 1931, released by Harmony Records as catalog number 1331-H, with the flip side "In the Merry Month of Maybe")
- Buddy Blue and his Texans (recorded May 1931, released by Crown Records as catalog number 3149A, with the flip side "On the Beach with You")
- Chick Bullock (recorded July 2, 1931, released by Banner Records as catalog numbers 32216 and 32261, by Oriole Records as catalog number 2294, by Perfect Records as catalog number 12735, and by Romeo Records as catalog number 1665, all with the flip side "I'm Through with Love")
- Bobby Byrne and his orchestra (recorded April 29, 1941, released by Decca Records as catalog number 3771A, with the flip side "On the Beach at Waikiki")
- Carlton Dance Orchestra (released by Madison Records as catalog number 6023, with the flip side "Walking Without You")
- The Carolina Club Orchestra (vocal: Skinnay Ennis; recorded May 15, 1931, released by Melotone Records as catalog number 12177, with the flip side "Sing a Little Jingle")
- Russ Case and his orchestra (released by MGM Records as catalog number 30337, with the flip side "When a Woman Loves a Man")
- Nat King Cole recorded the song on his 1958 album The Very Thought of You with arrangements by Gordon Jenkins.
- Perry Como (recorded February 1, 1951, released by RCA Victor Records as catalog number 20-4035, with the flip side "That Old Gang of Mine")
- Bing Crosby (recorded June 12, 1931, released by Brunswick Records as catalog number 6140, and as catalog number 80045, both with the flip side "I'm Through with Love"; re-recorded July 10, 1940, released by Decca Records as catalog number 25502, with the flip side "Please")
- Walter Davis (recorded March 13, 1938, released by Bluebird Records as catalog number 7589, with the flip side "When the Nights Are Lonesome")
- Arthur Fields (recorded November 1926, released by Emerson Records as catalog number 3095, with the flip side "I'm Gonna Park Myself in Your Arms")
- Shep Fields and his orchestra (recorded April 29, 1941, released by Bluebird Records as catalog number 11150, with the flip side "Marche Slave")
- Dizzy Gillespie with J. Richards (recorded October 31, 1950, released by Discovery Records as catalog number 143, with the flip side "What Is There to Say?")
- Benny Goodman and his orchestra (recorded May 5, 1941, released by Columbia Records as catalog number 36136, with the flip side "Good Evenin', Good Lookin'")
- Sam Johnson (pseudonym for Len Joy) and his orchestra (recorded June 9, 1931, released by Aurora Records as catalog number 128 and by Timely Tunes Records as catalog number C-1580, both with the flip side "The One-Man Band")
- Billy Jones with M. Kaplan's Orchestra (recorded November 1926, released by OKeh Records as catalog number 40726, with the flip side "Elsie Schultz-en-Heim")
- Irving Kaufman (released by Banner Records as catalog number 1854, with the flip side "My Girl has Eye Trouble", also released under the name "Charles Dickson" by Oriole Records as catalog number 740, with the flip side "Down in Mobile")
- Sam Lanin and his orchestra (vocal: P. Small; recorded June 2, 1931, released by Banner Records as catalog number 32219 and by Oriole Records as catalog number 2295, both with the flip side "Little Girl")
- Jack Leonard (recorded April 28, 1941, released by OKeh Records as catalog number 6200, with the flip side "When Your Lover Has Gone")
- Bob Manners and his orchestra (released by Fortune Records as catalog number 117, with the flip side "Arms and Legs Polka")
- Radio Franks (recorded September 21, 1926, released by Cameo Records as catalog number 1036, with the flip side "Pretty Birdie", by Challenge Records as catalog number 185, with the flip side "Moonlight on the Ganges", by Champion Records as catalog number CH15178, with the flip side "Here Comes Fatima", and by Romeo Records as catalog number 279, with the flip side "Don't I Know It?")
- Roy Smeck Vita Trio (recorded August 1931, released by Crown Records as catalog number 3186A, with the flip side "I'm Through with Love")
- Paul Specht and his orchestra (vocal: J. Morris; (recorded May 28, 1931, released by Columbia Records as catalog number 2482-D, with the flip side "Wrap Your Troubles in Dreams")
- The Sportsmen and Billy May's orchestra (released by Capitol Records as catalog numbers 593 and 1507, both with the flip side "Me and My Shadow")
- Barbra Streisand recorded the song for the Funny Lady soundtrack (1975).
- The Town Criers (released by ARA Records as catalog number 105, with the flip side "Dance with a Dolly")
- Tommy Tucker and his orchestra (recorded April 21, 1941, released by OKeh Records as catalog number 6188, with the flip side "Blues")
- Van and his Orchestra (recorded October 20, 1926, released by Pathé Records as catalog number 36551 and by Perfect Records as catalog number 14732, both with the flip side "Hello! Swanee, Hello!")
- Fred Waring's Pennsylvanians (recorded May 4, 1931, released by Victor Records as catalog number 22707A, with the flip side "Sing a Little Jingle")
- Victor Young and his orchestra (vocal: The Boswell Sisters; recorded May 25, 1931, released by Brunswick Records as catalog number 6128, with the flip side "Sing a Little Jingle")
- Entertainment attorney Bertram Fields recorded a version of the song with Les Deux Love Orchestra in 2022.
