= Carlyle Cousins =

British female vocal trio

The Carlyle Cousins
- Origin: London, England
- Genres: Vocal group
- Years active: 1931 – c.1939
- Labels: Columbia
- Past members: Cecile Petrie; Pauline Lister; Lilian Taylor; Helen Thornton

The Carlyle Cousins were a British female close harmony vocal trio, popular in the 1930s.

They formed in 1931, after singer and Royal Academy of Music student Cecile Petrie (née Thornton; born in Nairn, Scotland, 1910–1983) saw the Brox Sisters perform in a film and decided to adopt a similar style in England. She formed a duo with fellow student Pauline Lister, and they began performing harmony duets on stage. To make up a trio, they added pianist and singer Lilian Taylor, so establishing the Carlyle Cousins. After some time, Pauline Lister left, to be married in India, and was replaced by Helen Thornton, Cecile Petrie's sister.

The trio began performing with bandleader Ambrose, and made their first broadcast in 1932, performing "syncopated songs". They were an immediate success, making more broadcasts for the BBC in 1932 than any other act, and retained their popularity through the 1930s. Their radio programmes included Songs from the Shows, and they also toured as part of George Black's variety shows. They recorded for the Columbia label. Cecile Petrie also recorded as a singer with the Carroll Gibbons Orchestra.
