= Jinnah's People's Memorial Hall =

The Jinnah's People's Memorial Hall, is located inside the compound of the Indian National Congress building near Lamington Road, in Mumbai, India.

The hall was built in the honour of Jinnah after the historic victory of citizens of Bombay under the brave and brilliant leadership of Muhammad Ali Jinnah in front of the Town Hall of Bombay against the outgoing crown governor of Bombay, Wellingdon.

His admirers contributed sixty five thousand rupees to build this memorial Hall which stands still today in spite of the ravages of partition.

== See also ==
- Jinnah House
