= List of leaders of British dance bands =

This article is a list of people who led their own British dance band (distinct from British big band leaders, who played big band music). It includes those performers who were not British, but led a band based in Britain.

== A ==
- Harry Acres
- Bert Ambrose

== B ==
- Carl Barriteau
- Ivy Benson
- Harry Bidgood
- Stanley Black
- Josephine Bradley
- Teddy Brown

== C ==
- Billy Cotton

== D ==
- Joe Daniels
- Herman Darewski

== E ==
- Fred Elizalde
- George Elrick
- George Evans

== F ==
- Bert Firman
- John Firman
- Sid Firman
- Reginald Foresythe
- Roy Fox
- Ben Frankel

== G ==
- Freddy Gardner
- Geraldo
- Carroll Gibbons
- Nat Gonella
- Phil Green

== H ==
- Henry Hall (BBC Dance Orchestra)
- Fred Hartley
- Ted Heath
- Jack Hylton
- Mrs Jack Hylton
- Leslie "Jiver" Hutchinson

== J ==
- Jack Jackson
- Austen Croom-Johnson
- Ken "Snakehips" Johnson
- Archibald Joyce

== K ==
- Dave Kaye
- Ivor Kirchin
- Charlie Kunz
- Sydney Kyte

== L ==
- Brian Lawrance
- Jack Leon
- Louis Levy
- Sydney Lipton
- Joe Loss

== M ==
- Percival Mackey
- Ken Mackintosh
- Mantovani
- Billy Mayerl
- Felix Mendelssohn
- Sid Millward
- Gerry Moore
- Ivor Moreton

== N ==
- Ray Noble

== P ==
- Jack Payne
- Sid Phillips
- Lou Preager

== R ==
- Oscar Rabin
- Charles Remue
- John Reynders
- Hugo Rignold
- Edmundo Ros
- Harry Roy
- Charles "Buddy" Rogers
- Arthur Rosebery
- Val Rosing
- Syd Roy

== S ==
- Victor Silvester
- Debroy Somers
- Cyril Stapleton (BBC Show Band)
- Lew Stone

== T ==
- Al Tabor
- Nat Temple
- Billy Ternent
- Jay Wilbur

== W ==
- Hedley Ward
- Frank Weir
- Jay Wilbur
- Jack Wilson
- Maurice Winnick
- Eric Winstone

== See also ==
- The Savoy Havana Band
- The Savoy Orpheans
