= Brian Lawrance =

Australian musician (1909–1983)

- Born: Brian Vinrace Lawrance; 13 August 1909; Adelaide, South Australia, Australia
- Died: 11 September 1983 (aged 74)
- Genres: British dance band; jazz
- Occupations: Singer; bandleader; musician
- Instruments: Violin; vocals
- Labels: Panachord; Decca; Rex

Brian Vinrace Lawrance (13 August 1909 – 11 September 1983) was an Australian singer and violinist who led his own British dance band in the 1930s. Known for regular broadcasts with Fred Hartley and his Quintet, Lawrance was considered one of the leading dance band vocalists, and drew a large radio audience. Lawrance arrived in Britain in 1927, and returned to Australia in 1940, where he continued his career.

== Early life ==
Brian Vinrace Lawrance was born on 13 August 1909 to English parents Frederick Ebenezer Lawrance and Kathleen Lilian Lawrance (née Collier) in Adelaide, Australia. Aged seven, Brian Lawrance's performing career began when he sang "Australia Will Be There" at St Peter's Town Hall in Adelaide. Whilst still a young boy, he appeared in The Woman Suffers, a 1918 melodrama film. Lawrance toured the country as a singer with Pat Hanna's Diggers, and subsequently in musical comedy and variety, appearing in the shows Maytime and Hullo Everybody. He also studied the violin in Sydney under Mowat Carter. After three and a half years working in revue, Lawrance's mother took him to England in 1927, when he was 17.

== Career ==
After arriving in England, Lawrance performed in variety, singing and playing the violin. However, he also had a long period of unemployment, resulting in him investing money in a garage and working as a mechanic for 16 months.

Lawrance's first recording with a British dance band was "My Girl Don't Love Me Anymore", a duet with Jack Lorimer for Ray Noble and his New Mayfair Orchestra in March 1932, with Lawrance and Lorimer billed as "Eddie and Rex". In 1933, Lawrance joined Maurice Winnick's band as a violinist, and subsequently sang with Bertini's band in Blackpool. Lawrance contributed vocals to records by both bands, and it was with Bertini that he recorded his first solo vocal refrain with a British dance band in May 1933, singing "The Old Spinning Wheel" (released on the budget Eclipse label).

The entrepreneur T. L. Ahearn suggested that Lawrance form a dance band and audition for Clifford Whitley. Lawrance was advised by Whitley that there was a band at a Jermyn Street restaurant which he felt would suit him. Lawrance played with this band on a Thames showboat for three weeks. In 1934, he moved to Quaglino's restaurant, where he stayed for two and a half years.

At a party given at the Embassy Club by bandleader Ambrose, Lawrance sang, and was invited to make recordings. It was in March 1934 that he began recording with his own band, Quaglino's Quartet, at a session for Decca which featured himself on violin and vocals, with the first recording being "Dixie Lee". He largely provided his own vocals for the sessions he led as a bandleader.

His recordings led to radio appearances with Fred Hartley and his Sextet. Lawrance's band was resident at the Four Hundred Club, before moving to Lansdowne House in 1935. During this period, he appeared in five films: Marry Me (1932), She Shall Have Music (1935), in which he was the juvenile lead, Fame (1936), Variety Hour (1937) and Sing as You Swing (1937).

He also took part in a Jack Hylton show at the London Palladium. Lawrance featured on a 1936 set of Lambert & Butler cigarette cards profiling 25 dance band leaders.

Lawrance broadcast and recorded as a singer with bands led by Fred Hartley, Jack Hylton, Charles "Buddy" Rogers, Lew Stone, George Scott-Wood, Jay Wilbur, Debroy Somers, Arthur Young, Harry Hudson, Harry Leader, and Carroll Gibbons, the latter with the Savoy Hotel Orpheans. Lawrance also made a number of solo recordings on the Rex label.

In January 1940, Lawrance cut his last recordings as a bandleader in Britain, with his own vocals on all four titles: "Where or When", "Good Morning", "Are You Havin' Any Fun?" and "You Never Miss the Old Faces".

That year, he returned to Australia to lead the band at Romano's nightclub in Sydney, which he did for seven years. He visited Britain for six months in 1950 to appear with Hartley on BBC Radio. By 1954, Lawrance was singing with Hartley on twice-weekly ABC radio broadcasts. With his wife, Lawrance also ran a dress design company.

== Personal life and death ==
During the 1930s, Lawrance was living in Kilburn, north west London, before moving to nearby Maida Vale in west London.

In 1940, he married Jill Clayton, a dancer. Lawrance had three sons and two daughters, and was latterly married to Bernadette. In his later years, he was resident in Kensington, Sydney. He died on 11 September 1983, aged 74.
