= Maurice Elwin =

Background information
- Also known as: John Curtis; Maurice Kelvin; Donald O'Keefe; Guy Victor; Max Wynn many others
- Born: Norman MacPhail Blair; 14 June 1896; Uddingston, Lanarkshire, Scotland
- Died: 5 October 1975 (aged 79) Hampstead, London, England
- Genres: Dance band, traditional pop
- Occupations: Singer, voice coach
- Years active: 1916–1959

Norman MacPhail Blair (14 June 1896 – 5 October 1975), who most often used the pseudonym Maurice Elwin in his professional work, was a British dance band singer and songwriter who was popular between the First and Second World Wars. He used over 60 different pseudonyms, both as a singer and composer, including John Curtis, Maurice Kelvin, Donald O'Keefe, Guy Victor, and Max Wynn, as well as sometimes using the name Norman Blair.

== Life and career ==
He was born in Uddingston, Lanarkshire, Scotland, the son of a stockbroker's cashier and a music teacher. Both his parents sang and played piano locally, and several of his brothers and sisters also became musically active. Norman Blair started performing as a child. He attended Glasgow Academy, before moving to London where he studied at the Royal Academy of Music under Sir Henry Wood. In the First World War, he enlisted with the Highland Light Infantry, but seems not to have seen combat, and was eventually discharged on health grounds.

He made his first known recording, as Maurice Elwin, in 1916, though it was not issued at the time, and performed with pianist and composer Isador Epstein. In 1918, he started advertising himself as a singing teacher in Reading. He met Zena, a war widow with two children, and they married in 1925. He joined Lareine, a music publishing firm, in 1923, and composed music, but by 1926 returned to singing and recording, notably with the Gramophone Company and on the Parlophone label. He recorded many solo performances and duets, as well as uncredited vocals on dance band records, simply noted anonymously as "vocal refrain".

A baritone singer, Elwin was one of the most prolific British recording artists of the era, recording some 2,000 tracks. His style was said to be "understated and subtle", relatively unemotional and with precise diction. Among the many bands with whom he recorded in the 1920s and early 1930s were those of Bert Firman and Arthur Lally. These were regarded at the time as "hot" bands, though Elwin also recorded with more orchestral ensembles, notably the Savoy Orpheans led by Carroll Gibbons in the early 1930s. By 1936, he was said to receive the highest salary ever paid to a British dance band singer.

Elwin made many broadcasts on BBC radio in the 1930s, and was described there as "The Monarch of the Microphone" and as "The mystery gramophone voice of many names". He also composed songs, the most notable perhaps being "At the End of the Day", recorded by Gracie Fields and later by Dorothy Squires.

After the mid-1930s, his output diminished greatly and he made few recordings. One factor was "pernicious catarrh", which affected his voice. He became well known as a teacher of singing based in Hampstead, described in publicity as "voice doctor to the stars", and using a stethoscope to test "voice resonance". He continued to make occasional radio appearances, both on the BBC and Radio Luxembourg, until the late 1950s.

He died in 1975, aged 79, and was buried in Hampstead Cemetery.
