= Ivor Moreton and Dave Kaye =

English piano duo

- Genres: Jazz; British dance band; traditional pop; boogie woogie
- Instruments: Piano, vocals, drums, string bass, Hawaiian guitar
- Years active: 1931–1954
- Label: Parlophone
- Spinoff of: Harry Roy & His RKOlians; Harry Roy & His Orchestra; Harry Roy's Tiger-Ragamuffins
- Past members: Ivor Moreton; Dave Kaye

Ivor Moreton and Dave Kaye were an English musical variety double act who were known for performing syncopated piano duets together from the 1930s to the 1950s. The duo consisted of pianists Ivor Arthur Moreton (born Arthur Lethbridge; 18 March 1908 – 9 December 1984) and David "Dave" Kaye (born David Keigel; 13 March 1906 – 15 December 1996), who had both been members of Harry Roy's dance band, the act developing from Roy's small group, the Tiger Ragamuffins. They played at two pianos, usually with Kaye carrying the melody, and Moreton embellishing it.

Ivor Moreton and Dave Kaye were a headline act in variety and radio, regularly appearing at venues run by Moss Empires, who were responsible for the largest chain of theatres and music halls in the UK. The Stage wrote of Moreton and Kaye that, "With their slick evening dress and immaculate stage appearance, they endeared themselves to lovers of light entertainment in a polished but unassuming way."

== Early lives ==
David Kaye was born on 13 March 1906 in Shoreditch, London. His parents, Leah (née Kalisky) and Reuben Keigel, were born in Warsaw, then part of the Russian Empire. Reuben was a hairdresser, with Leah working in the business, and the family lived in Hackney. Dave formally changed his surname to Kaye in July 1940. He worked in a timber merchant's office for three years, before getting a job accompanying a woman who sang songs in a store advertising sheet music.

Ivor Moreton, originally named Arthur Lethbridge, was born in Barnsbury, London on 18 March 1908 to parents Mary Elizabeth (née Doncaster) and Frederick Charles Lethbridge. His father was a compositor in the printing trade. Upon leaving school at 15, Ivor worked in a stockbroker's office, and left this job to become a cellulose sprayer, with the job of tracing designs onto dresses. He had already been able to play the piano for some time, and provided accompaniment at local parties in the evenings. At a local dance, he was asked if he would like to play professionally. He was then offered a job playing at a small night club.

== Career ==
=== With Harry Roy ===
Following Dave Kaye's job in the shop, he formed his own band, and worked as a pianist for Jerry Hoey, Sydney Lipton and Jack Harris. In 1926, he joined drummer and xylophonist Julian Vedey's new band at the Cosmo Club in Wardour Street, Soho, in a residency which lasted around six months. Coinciding with the end of this period was the departure of Kaye's brother Cyril for Sydney, to lead a band at the Wentworth Hotel. In 1929, it was reported that Dave was part of a new band at The Piccadilly Hotel, led by Jim Kelleher on alto sax, with Kaye on piano and Joe Daniels on drums. During this period of his career, Kaye was also part of Maurice Winnick's band at the hotel, although by August 1931, he had been replaced.

Ivor Moreton, who had been professionally active since at least 1930, was invited by drummer Bill Currie to join him in an act at a club, where Moreton and Kaye first met each other. By 1931, Moreton was a pianist with Harry Roy's five-piece band at the Bat Club, being with Roy from his first recording session in April that year. In addition, Moreton also sang on vocals with Currie, and in a trio with Roy. Later that year, Roy formed a larger band to take to the RKO Theatre in Leicester Square, and it was at this point that Kaye joined, thus starting Moreton and Kaye's long professional association. From October 1931 onwards, Moreton was on piano, and Kaye on second piano at Roy's recording sessions. In autumn 1932, Moreton sang his first solo vocal refrain for Roy on his version of "Love Is the Sweetest Thing", a song which became a standard. Moreton subsequently contributed further solo vocal refrains to Roy's records.

In 1933, Moreton and other members of the band joined Syd Roy and His R.K. Olians, an outfit fronted by Harry's brother. Moreton played piano and contributed vocals, whilst Cyril Kaye was also a pianist for the group. This line-up recorded for the budget Eclipse label (owned by Woolworths) from April to October 1933. In December that year, a Parlophone record credited to "Ivor Moreton & Dave Kaye" was released, with the label describing them as "Harry Roy's Famous Pianists On Two Pianos". The record consisted of two medleys of jazz standards: one side featured them performing "St. Louis Blues" and "Some of These Days", whilst the other had "Dinah", "After You've Gone" and "Nobody's Sweetheart". Joe Daniels also received billing for playing the drums on these recordings.

Perhaps aided by his role in the spotlight as the band's singer, it was reported in early February 1934 that Moreton was receiving fan mail of more than 200 letters a week. On 5 February that year, Moreton and Kaye made their first recordings as part of Harry Roy's Tiger Ragamuffins (a name coined by Moreton's father), a smaller group in which the pianists took a key role. Led by Roy, the group also featured Arthur Calkin on bass and Daniels on drums.

=== Headline act ===
The Silver Jubilee Royal Variety Performance at the London Palladium in October 1935 featured the duo as part of Roy's band. Moreton and Kaye also appeared in the 1936 musical film Everything is Rhythm, which starred Roy; however, by the time it made it into cinemas, the duo had left the band to concentrate on their own career as duettists in variety. They departed in January 1936, and were joined on tour by drummer Ossie Noble.

In April 1936, their first 78 since leaving Roy was issued on Parlophone, with a "Fox Trot Medley" on one side and a "Quickstep Medley" on the other. Their "Tin Pan Alley" series of contemporary hit medleys ran to almost 100 issues.

On 7 April 1937, Moreton and Kaye cut their only sides as leaders of a band, The Rhythm Rogues. Directed by Kaye, both played piano on "Harbour Lights" and "Head Over Heels in Love", with Moreton providing vocals on the former title. Moreton and Kaye continued to be prolific on gramophone records in their own right, with piano medleys issued regularly. Entertainment agent Keith Salberg later said of the duo, "They were wonderfully slick – a sort of jazzed up version of Rawicz and Landauer. They were a housewives' favourite," he added, noting that "everybody" had a Moreton and Kaye 78 "somewhere in their house."

April 1937 also saw the duo appearing in their own BBC Television slot, during the early days of the medium in Britain. They were referred to in the press and on theatre bills as "The Original Tiger Rag pianists", having played on Harry Roy's 1933 recording of the song. In June, they had their own slot on the BBC National Programme. Later that year, the duo toured Scandinavia. In early 1938, they could be heard in their own series, Tomorrow's Songs, on the BBC Regional Programme in London.

Moreton and Kaye also composed several tunes together, including "Peter Pan". Billed as "The Original Tiger Ragamuffins", cinema audiences could see them playing "Peter Pan" at two grand pianos in an August 1938 Pathétone newsreel. In October that year, they topped the Concert Hall bill for the final week of the Empire Exhibition in Glasgow, where Kaye played the electric Hammond organ as part of their stage act for the first time. In the late 1930s, the duo made forays into classical music, recording a two-part medley of Franz Lehar waltzes and Franz Liszt's Hungarian Rhapsody No. 2. Their recordings tended to have accompaniment on drums, string bass, and occasionally, Hawaiian guitar.

The advent of the Second World War saw their performing career briefly interrupted. Moreton volunteered for service in the Royal Air Force in June 1940, leaving Kaye to temporarily go solo, before he also enlisted. The pair were reunited during the war to entertain troops at RAF bases around the UK. In 1943, they had their own BBC Radio series, Keys For Two. Moreton and Kaye both achieved the rank of Sergeant, and Moreton served in the British Liberation Army.

=== Post-war success ===
Having been released from the RAF, Moreton and Kaye continued performing, with a contemporary review from December 1945 describing the previous night's show at Dudley Hippodrome as an "exhilarating performance". Their popularity ensured that they were still top of the bill. In January and April 1947, Moreton and Kaye appeared in two further short films for British Pathé, in which they could be seen playing boogie woogie. Rather than the pre-war evening dress, they wore informal suits.

They continued touring, and visited Australia in 1949 to appear in the revue Starry Nights on the Tivoli theatre circuit. It was reported that the duo liked the country so much that they were considering settling there. Whilst in Australia, they also played the Ugly sisters in a Sydney production of the pantomime Cinderella. Moreton and Kaye ended up staying in Australia for thirteen months. Back in Britain, they had a regular slot on the BBC Light Programme in late 1950.

They were also still making recordings for Parlophone: although there were no UK record sales charts until November 1952, research published in 2013 stated that Moreton and Kaye's recording of "Ivory Rag", a popular contemporary song, would have been on the Top 30 bestselling singles lists in August 1951.

In October that year, they once again played at the Royal Variety Performance: this time, as part of a Keyboard Quintette, with Carroll Gibbons, Charlie Kunz and Billy Thorburn. From April to June 1952, the duo had a weekly radio show on the Light Programme. In May 1953, they were back in Australia, fronting The Ivor Moreton and Dave Kaye Show at the Theatre Royal in Adelaide.

Ivor Moreton and Dave Kaye's last billed BBC appearance was in October 1954 on Piano Playtime, a radio broadcast on the Light Programme. Their final 78, a two-part medley titled "Moreton And Kaye's Christmas Music", was issued in December that year. They appeared together until the mid-1950s, at a time when trends in popular music were changing. According to Kaye, "We decided to get out while still at the top". In 1959, they opened a restaurant in Kensington, west London, which became a popular meeting spot for musicians and those in show business.

== Personal lives and deaths ==
In an interview, Moreton and Kaye gave their mutual interests as golf, tennis and gin rummy.

Moreton was sued by Florence Addicott in May 1935. A dressmaker, she had met Moreton at a social club where he was the pianist in the late 1920s. Addicott claimed that at Christmas 1931, they had agreed to marry, but he had broken off the engagement by letter in September 1934. Moreton claimed that Addicott had ended the engagement. A court ordered him to pay her £500 in a breach of promise of marriage case. During this period, he was living in Peckham.

He married Betty Shirley Gardner in Marylebone, west London, in 1936. In the early years of their marriage, the couple lived on Baker Street. During the Second World War, they were living in Beckenham, Kent. In January 1945, they had a daughter. Following the end of the war, they were again resident in Marylebone. He latterly lived in Coombe, Kingston upon Thames. Moreton died in Kingston on 9 December 1984, aged 76, and was survived by his wife.

In the early part of his career, Kaye lived in Stamford Hill, north London, and later in Cricklewood. He married Dorothy Partridge in 1957 in Kensington. Kaye died in Hendon on 15 December 1996, aged 90, survived by his wife Dorothy.
