= Frank Guarente =

American jazz musician

Francesco Saverio "Frank" Guarente (October 5, 1893, Montemiletto, Italy - July 21, 1942, New York City) was an American jazz trumpeter, composer, and bandleader.

Guarente received formal training in music while in Italy, and emigrated to America in 1910, settling in Allentown, Pennsylvania, where a brother of his lived. He relocated to New Orleans in 1914, where he took a job in a bank and associated with ethnically Italian musicians such as Nick LaRocca and Tony Parenti; he also met King Oliver, and eventually started getting gigs with New Orleans brass bands. He played at Tom Anderson's club and toured Texas under the name Ragtime Frank with his ensemble, the Alabama Five. In 1917, he served in the United States Army during World War I, then played in Philadelphia with Charlie Kerr (alongside Eddie Lang).

He founded his own group in 1921 in New York, which included Arthur Schutt and Chauncey Morehouse. Soon after, Paul Specht picked his players up to join a larger orchestra, and Guarente played with Specht, including on European tours, through 1924. He also led a Specht side group called The Georgians, which recorded between 1922 and 1924 in the style of the Original Dixieland Jass Band. In 1924, he left Specht to form his own group, The New Georgians, which was active until 1927 and did its own European tours. In 1927-1928, he worked in England with the Savoy Orpheans and ensembles associated with Bert Firman. Returning to the United States in 1928, he joined Specht's orchestra again, playing until 1930. He joined Victor Young's band in 1930, remaining there until 1936, and also played with Jimmy Dorsey, Tommy Dorsey, Jack Teagarden, Bing Crosby, and The Boswell Sisters on record and radio. In 1937, ill health forced him to stop performing.
