= The Georgians (American band) =

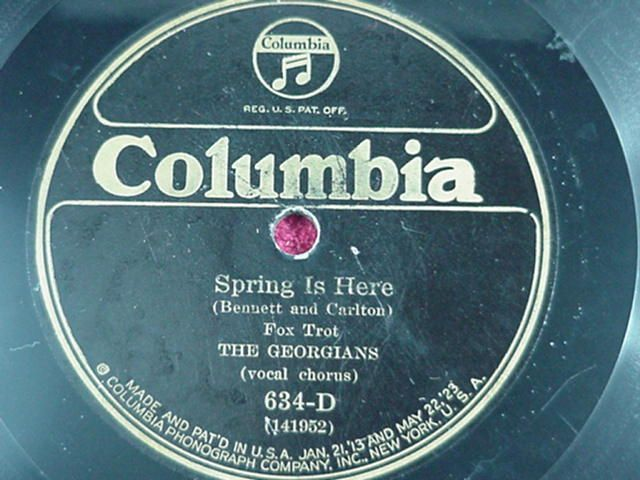
The Georgians - Spring is Here record

The Georgians were a jazz and dance band formed in 1921 and led by trumpeter Frank Guarente. It was one of the earliest "bands within a band", being a subset of the Paul Specht Orchestra. Specht's full group played in the ballroom of the Hotel Alamac in New York City beginning in 1920; a subgroup performed in the hotel's cocktail lounge or nightclub under the leadership of Guarente.

The Georgians recorded on Columbia Records. Specht credited Columbia A & R executive Frank Walker with the group's name. The Georgians' first recording was Columbia A3775, containing "I Wish I Could Shimmy Like My Sister Kate" and their rendition of the popular tune "Chicago" on the flip side, recorded in November 1922 and released in March 1923. Another record was Columbia 23-D: "Hometown Blues" and "You May Be Fast, But Your Mama's Gonna Slow You Down". Their chief arranger was pianist Arthur Schutt. The group toured Europe from 1922 to 1924, before rejoining the Phil Specht Orchestra.

After the group disbanded, Guarente formed the New Georgians and toured Europe from 1924 to 1927.

A few studio recording groups used the name between 1924 and 1929. According to one source, they were the Georgians without Guarente and with different directors, while Scott Yanow states they were unrelated. Two titles were released in 1925 featuring Red Nichols.
