= The Charleston Chasers =

- Genres: Jazz, swing
- Years active: 1925–1931
- Labels: Columbia
- Past members: Vic Berton; Jimmy Dorsey; Roy Evans; Benny Goodman; Scrappy Lambert; Dick McDonough; Glenn Miller; Miff Mole; Phil Napoleon; Red Nichols; Pee Wee Russell; Arthur Schutt; Paul Small; Kate Smith; Joe Tarto; Eva Taylor; Charlie Teagarden; Jack Teagarden

The Charleston Chasers was a studio recording ensemble that recorded music on Columbia Records between 1925 and 1931. They recorded early versions of songs such as "After You've Gone", "Ain't Misbehavin'", and "My Melancholy Baby". Their 1931 recording of "Basin Street Blues" featured Benny Goodman, who stated that it was the first time that he was able to show his own musical personality on record.

The group's rendition of "Someday Sweetheart" was featured on the soundtrack of the Depression-era crime drama Road to Perdition.

== Associated artists ==
- Vic Berton, drummer
- Jimmy Dorsey, clarinet
- Roy Evans, vocals
- Benny Goodman, clarinet
- Scrappy Lambert, vocals
- Dick McDonough, banjo or guitar
- Glenn Miller, trombone
- Miff Mole, trombone
- Phil Napoleon, trumpet
- Red Nichols, cornet
- Pee Wee Russell, clarinet
- Arthur Schutt, piano
- Paul Small, vocals
- Kate Smith, vocals
- Joe Tarto, tuba
- Eva Taylor, vocals
- Charlie Teagarden, trumpet
- Jack Teagarden, trombone
