= Hank D'Amico =

American jazz clarinetist (1915–1965)

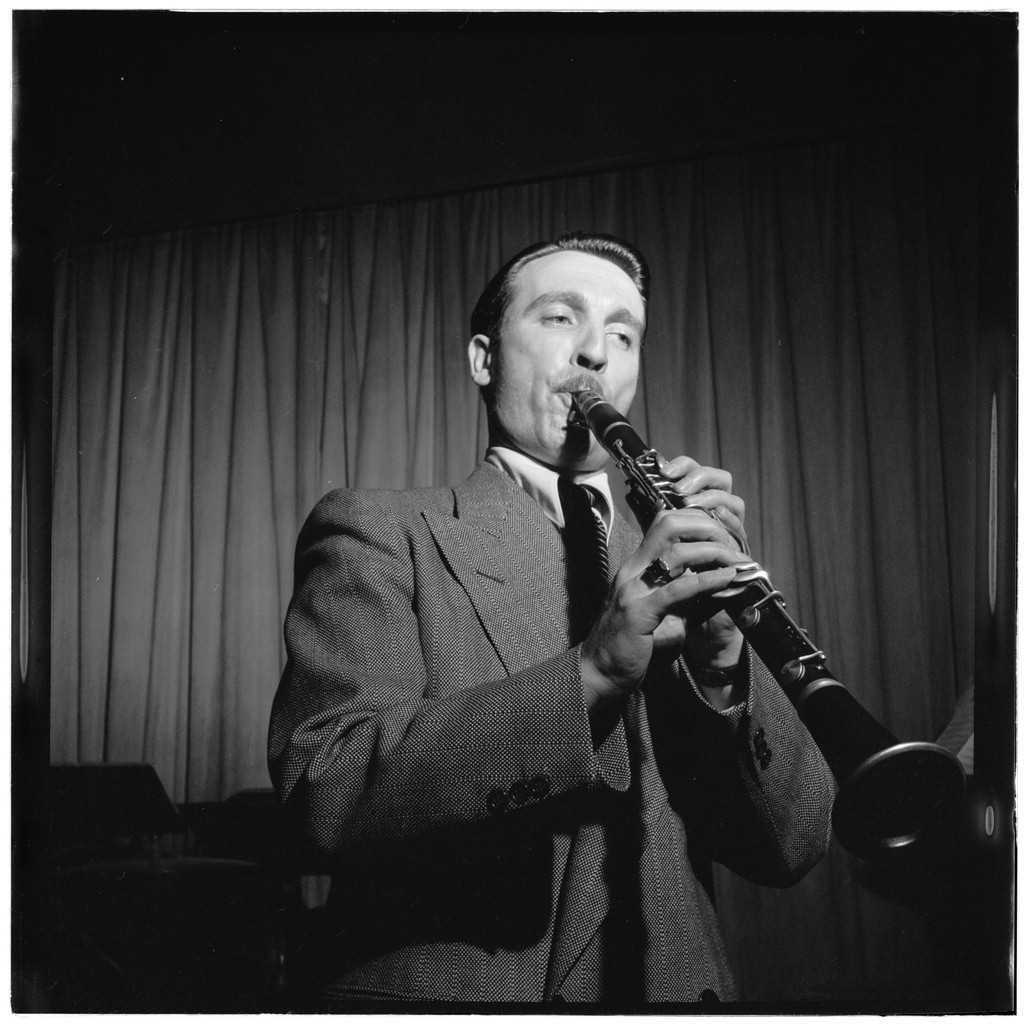

Background information
- Born: March 21, 1915; Rochester, New York, U.S.
- Died: December 2, 1965 (aged 50); New York City, New York, U.S.
- Genres: Jazz
- Instruments: Clarinet

Hank D'Amico (March 21, 1915 – December 2, 1965) was an American jazz clarinetist.

== Early life ==
D'Amico was born in Rochester, New York, and was raised in Buffalo.

== Career ==
D'Amico began playing professionally with Paul Specht's band in 1936. That same year, he joined Red Norvo. In 1938, D'Amico began radio broadcasts with his own octet, before returning briefly to Norvo's group in 1939. He played with Bob Crosby's orchestra in 1940 and 1941, then had his own big band for about a year. D'Amico had short stints in the bands of Les Brown, Benny Goodman and Norvo again, before working for CBS in New York. He also played with Miff Mole and Tommy Dorsey. D'Amico spent ten years as a staff musician for ABC, and then played with Jack Teagarden in 1954. From that point he mostly worked with small groups, infrequently forming his own band. D'Amico played at the 1964 New York World's Fair with the Morey Feld Trio.

== Personal life ==
Hank D'Amico died from cancer in December 1965 in New York, at the age of 50.
