= After Many Years =

After Many Years can refer to:

- After Many Years (1908 film), a 1908 American film
- After Many Years (1930 film), a 1930 British film
