= Elsie Carlisle =

- Elsie Carlisle c. 1926

Background information
- Born: Elizabeth Carlisle; 28 January 1896; Manchester, England, UK
- Died: 5 September 1977 (aged 81) Chelsea, London, England
- Genre: British dance band
- Occupation: Singer
- Instrument: Vocals
- Years active: 1916-1955
- Website: elsiecarlisle.com

Elizabeth 'Elsie' Carlisle (28 January 1896 – 5 September 1977) was an English female singer both before and during the British dance band era of the 1920s and 1930s, nicknamed "Radio Sweetheart Number One"; according to AllMusic, she was "beyond a doubt the most popular radio performer in England in the '30s." Carlisle has also been described as "British radio's first woman crooner". She was prolific in the recording studio, and cut over 300 sides between 1926 and 1942.

== Early life ==
Elsie was born in Manchester to parents James Carlisle and Mary Ellen Carlisle (née Cottingham). As a child, Elsie's mother paid for her to have singing lessons. At the age of nine, she was appearing on stage in her native Manchester and nearby Cheshire. A 1912 review of a performance in Bedminster, Bristol, described Carlisle as a "lively comedienne and graceful dancer."

== Singing career ==
Carlisle's earliest known recording was a test for the Gramophone Company, made in Hayes, Middlesex, in 1918. However, it was not until 1926 that she made her first commercially released recordings. On her earliest sessions, she was accompanied by Carroll Gibbons on piano, and began recording vocals for dance bands in 1929; she sang with several of the biggest dance bands of the era, including the famous Ambrose orchestra. Carlisle was also backed by Ambrose when she performed solo, and duetted with Sam Browne, being hailed as one of the band's best singers.

Carlisle's performance of "Home, James, and Don't Spare the Horses" with the Ambrose orchestra might have helped to popularise this phrase. Her other most well-known song may be "A Nightingale Sang in Berkeley Square". However, Carlisle's greatest claim to fame is that Cole Porter personally requested her to introduce his composition "What is This Thing Called Love?", which became a jazz standard.

She made a number of appearances in film shorts and on television in the 1930s. Two Pathé films are available on YouTube: a 1931 short with her singing "Alone and Afraid" and "My Canary Has Circles Under His Eyes", and an entire reel of Radio Parade (1933).

She recorded very little after the beginning of the Second World War, with her final session taking place in January 1942. Carlisle continued to make broadcasts until 1945, and she retired from the entertainment industry in the early 1950s. Amongst her last appearances was performing in variety at the Windsor Theatre in Bearwood, near Birmingham, in October 1951. A reviewer noted that she was "as charming and pleasing as ever." The following month, she was billed in These Radio Times, a "history of Everyman's entertainment" on the BBC Light Programme.

== Later career ==
As her performing career wound down, Carlisle focused more on business interests outside of show business. In 1950, Elsie Carlisle's Tooting Ballroom in Tooting, south London, was being advertised. Other ventures included a company manufacturing bar accessories in Putney, a pub in Mayfair and a pub hotel in Wokingham, Berkshire.

Carlisle's last public appearances were as a guest on the nostalgia-themed Thames Television programme Looks Familiar, in 1973 and 1975.

== Personal life and death ==
At the age of 16, Carlisle fell pregnant, and on 16 June 1913, she gave birth to a son, Basil Albert. His father was Wilfred Malpas, a 23-year old decorator, whom Carlisle married on 8 August 1914 at St. Edmund's Roman Catholic Church in Miles Platting, Manchester, when she was 18. The couple had a second child on 20 November 1914, called Wilfred Ypres. By 1919, Carlisle had established herself as a single actress in London. Although the couple did not remain together, they were legally married until his death in 1962. Their sons were raised by Elsie's mother, Mary Ellen Carlisle. Wilfred died in 1993, and Basil in 2000.

Elsie Carlisle also performed with the Jack Hylton orchestra; she and Hylton had an affair, leading to unfounded rumours that her son, Willie, was fathered by him.

From 1937 until her death, Carlisle lived in Deanery Street in Mayfair, central London. She died of cancer on 5 September 1977, aged 81, at the Royal Marsden Hospital in Chelsea, London. She left £79,369, equivalent to £466,320 in 2025.

== Legacy ==
Two songs performed by Carlisle (accompanied by Ambrose) were featured in the Dennis Potter television series Pennies From Heaven in 1978. "You've Got Me Crying Again" and "The Clouds Will Soon Roll By" were featured in the episode "The Sweetest Thing", with the latter also heard in "Down Sunnyside Lane".

== Discography ==
A complete listing of Carlisle's recording sessions can be found at her website. Her work has also been re-issued on several CD compilations:

- Radio Sweetheart No. 1 (ASV Living Era, 1999)
- And The Band Played On (Pegasus, 2002)
- My Canary Has Circles Under His Eyes (Dutton Vocalion, 2002)
- I Love My Baby (Crystal Stream Audio, 2004)
- Volume 2: I Poured My Heart into a Song (Dutton Vocalion, 2005)
- With a Different Style (Memory Lane, 2012)
- The Early Years (Memory Lane, 2016)
- Public Sweetheart No.1 (Memory Lane, 2020)
- Body and Soul (Windyridge, 2022)
- Smoke gets in Your Eyes (Windyridge, 2022)
