= Sylvester Ahola =

American jazz trumpeter and cornetist (1902–1995)

Sylvester Ahola (May 24, 1902 – February 13, 1995), a.k.a. Hooley, was a classic jazz trumpeter and cornetist born in Gloucester, Massachusetts. His parents, Sophia and John Ahola, were born in Finland. He became most popular in England rather than the United States, and he first began performing with Frank Ward and His Orchestra. In 1925 he started playing with Paul Specht and His Orchestra, with whom he did a two-month-long tour of England that following year. For the next couple of years he performed with bands like The California Ramblers and Adrian Rollini and his band.

In 1927 he moved to England and landed a job playing with the Savoy Orpheans and then gigged with Bert Firman and Bert Ambrose. The British Musicians' Union, unhappy to see a foreigner land so many jobs and attain so much success, effectively prohibited him from playing with anyone other than Bert Ambrose. This forced him to eventually leave in 1931 and return to New York City, where he never again achieved the level of success he had enjoyed during his time in England.
