= Joe Tarto =

American jazz musician

Joe Tarto (February 22, 1902 - August 24, 1986) was an American jazz tubist and bassist.

Tarto (born Vincent Joseph Tortoriello) played trombone from age 12 before settling on tuba as a teenager. He played in an Army band in World War I, where he was wounded, and received his release in 1919. In the 1920s he worked with Cliff Edwards, Paul Specht, Sam Lanin, and Vincent Lopez, in addition to doing arrangement work for Fletcher Henderson and Chick Webb and playing in pit orchestras on Broadway. He also recorded copiously throughout the 1920s, accompanying musicians including Bing Crosby, The Boswell Sisters, Ethel Waters, Eddie Lang, Joe Venuti, Miff Mole, Red Nichols, The Dorsey Brothers, Bix Beiderbecke, and Phil Napoleon.

In the 1930s he spent to years playing with Roger Wolfe Kahn, then worked extensively as a session musician both on tuba and double bass. He also played with radio ensembles and in theater and symphony orchestras. He remained active as a performer into the 1980s, playing in Dixieland jazz revival groups in his last years.
