= Savoy Havana Band =

British dance band of the 1920s

The Savoy Havana Band was a British dance band of the 1920s. It was resident at the Savoy Hotel, London, between 1921 and 1927. The band made their first live outside broadcast on the British Broadcasting Corporation from the Savoy Hotel on 3 October, 1923.

== History ==
The band was formed by the American saxophonist Bert Ralton (aka Bert Louis Ralton; né Albert Lewis Ralton; ca. 1885–1927) in 1921. Originally there were six players including Ralton. It was later increased to ten players. From 1924 it was led by the English violinist Reginald Batten. Both the Savoy Havana Band and their colleagues the Savoy Orpheans were under the management of Wilfred de Mornys.

Among the players was a young American saxophonist, Rudy Vallée, whose attempts to become a vocalist were discouraged by his fellow players. Another member of the ensemble was the pianist Billy Mayerl. On 15 June 1925, alongside the Orpheans, the band played in the first British performance of George Gershwin's Rhapsody in Blue with Gershwin himself on piano. The performance was broadcast live by the BBC.

The owner of the Savoy Hotel, Rupert D'Oyly Carte, called the original Savoy Havana Band and the Savoy Orpheans "probably the best-known bands in Europe." When de Morny's contractual arrangement with the Savoy Hotel company ended on 31 December 1927, the band went on tour, and disbanded in 1930.

They appeared in the 1930 film After Many Years.
