= Sam Browne (musician) =

English dance band singer (1898–1972)

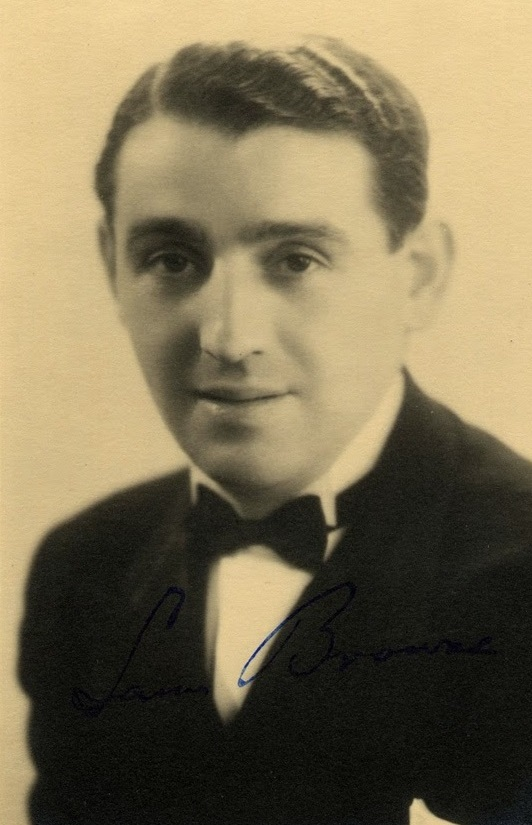
Browne circa 1935

Samuel Browne (born Samuel Brown; 26 March 1898 – 2 March 1972) was a singer who became one of the most popular British dance band vocalists of the 1930s. He is remembered for singing with Jack Hylton and with Ambrose and his orchestra, at the Mayfair Hotel and Embassy Club, with whom he made many recordings from 1930 to 1942. Browne also worked with several other popular dance bands from the time, such as those led by Lew Stone and Billy Cotton. Browne was most famous for his duets and variety performances with the singer Elsie Carlisle.

== Early life ==
Sam Browne was born in 1898 to East London Lithuanian Jewish parents and was one of eleven children. His introduction to singing came at the local synagogue as a chorister. After leaving school, he had several jobs before reaching the age of 18 during the First World War, when he joined the Merchant Navy. Some of the voyages took him to New York and it was there that he discovered jazz. After leaving the Merchant Navy, Browne bought a drum kit and with two friends who played piano and guitar, they formed the Tottenham Dance Band. After some success as their vocalist, Browne went solo and found work mainly around various London clubs, including a brief spell in 1921 with Jack Hylton's Queen's Roof Orchestra. In 1928, when Hylton was looking for a new singer, he remembered Browne and offered him a job.

== Career ==
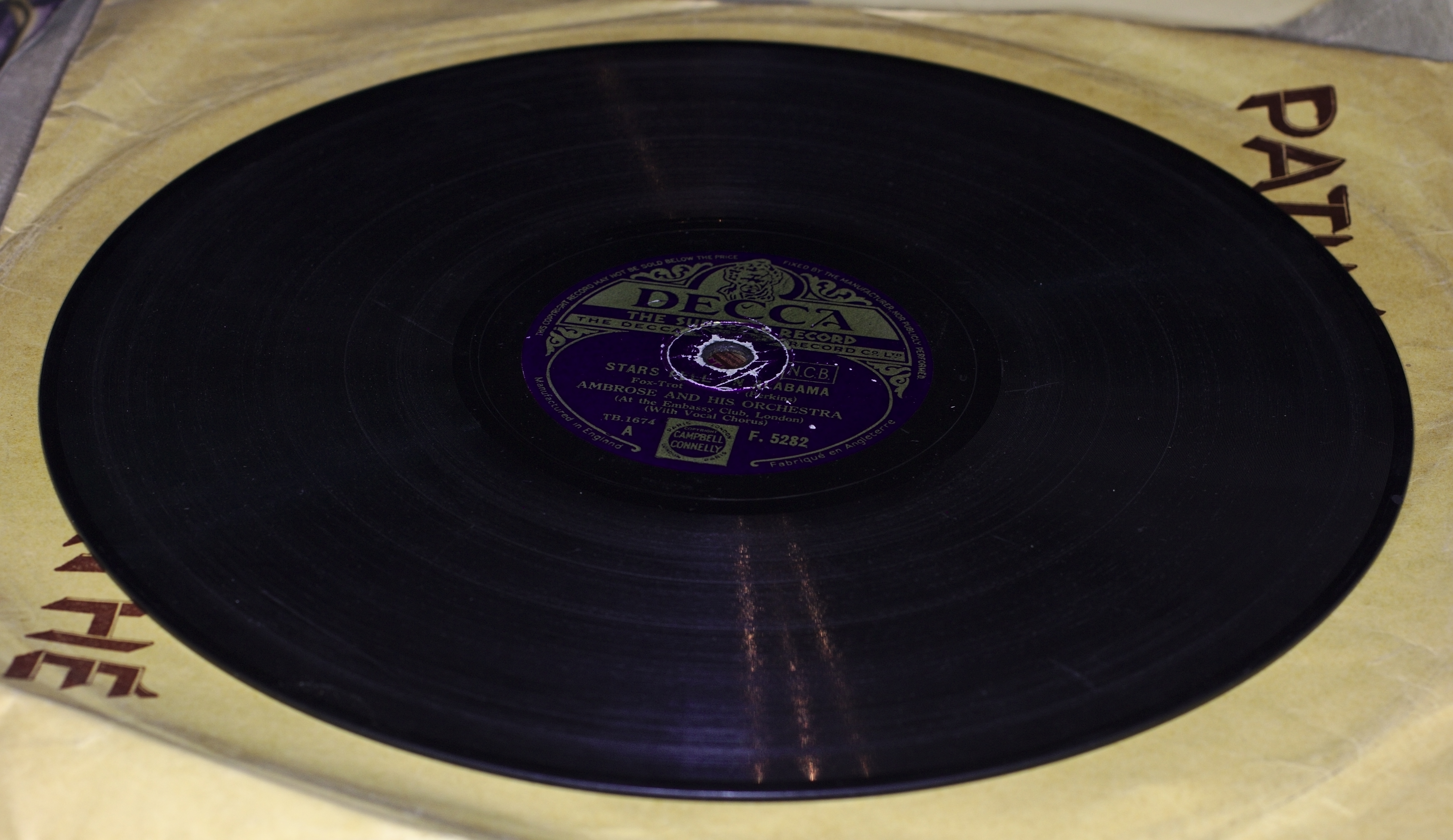
Decca 78rpm record of 1934 Ambrose and his Orchestra - "Stars Fell on Alabama" with vocal refrain by Sam Browne.

Browne's first recording was made with the Jack Hylton band on 23 August 1928: "That's My Weakness Now", issued on His Master's Voice B5520. The band at that time included Jack Jackson (trumpet), Lew Davis and Leo Vauchant (trombone), Chappie D'Amato, E.O. Pogson, Billy Ternent (reeds) and Hugo Rignold (vn).

Over approximately a year and a half, Browne made over 100 records with Hylton, including sessions in Berlin and Milan, and was to return to the studios with the Hylton band between 1938 and 1940.

Browne first recorded with Bert Ambrose's band on 8 February 1930: the titles, on the Decca label, were "A Little Kiss Each Morning" and "Body And Soul". It was recorded again on 22 February with a violin solo by Eric Siday. By March 1930, Ambrose had switched to the His Master's Voice label, and more Browne recordings began to appear such as "Moanin' For You" (B5813) "Cryin' For the Carolines" (B5814), "A Bench in the Park" (B5842) and "Leven Thirty Saturday Night" (B5847).

Browne's work with Ambrose took him to Monte Carlo and Biarritz, coupled with regular radio broadcasts from the May Fair Hotel. Browne and Elsie Carlisle became a popular singing pair with Ambrose. Popular duets with Elsie include "What Wouldja Like for Breakfast?" and "I'm Gonna Wash My Hands of You". They appeared together in the Royal Variety Performance in 1935. Browne also appeared in the 1950 Royal Variety Performance as part of a presentation titled "The Band That Jack Built" and in the 1951 show as "Sam Browne and His Singers".

A reader of music, Browne's confident and warm delivery made him popular with bandleaders and record buyers. He made over 2,000 recordings; some of the other bands that featured him included Alfredo (on Edison), Bertini (on Eclipse), Harry Bidgood (on Broadcast), Harry Hudson (also on Edison) and Lew Stone (Decca).

Browne was often featured in radio broadcasts and he had his own 15-minute programme, Sing with Sam, in 1947 on the BBC Light Programme.

Browne was featured in several British films, including Calling All Stars, Variety Parade and Hi Gang, as well as on numerous film shorts. He also worked with Bebe Daniels and Ben Lyon: before World War II in Radio Luxembourg's Rinso Radio Revue, and during the war in the Hi Gang! radio series. After the war, Browne continued to tour and record. In 1948, with the American musicians on strike, Decca issued a number of its records on the London label and Browne's recording of "A Tree in the Meadow" reached No. 22 in the Billboard charts during a five-week stay.

In 1952, Browne set up an employment agency and training school for theatrical artists at 11a St. James's Place, London SW1, known as Sam Browne Studios.

== Personal life ==
Little is known about his personal life, but it is understood that Browne's first wife, Terry, died at an early age in 1931. He remarried a few years later, but his second marriage broke up in 1954 as his career waned. He had two daughters, Myrna and Carole.

On November 3, 1941, Browne was travelling by train to fulfil an engagement at the Bristol Hippodrome, when something crashed through the window and he fell to the floor. It was found that he had been shot in the jaw and neck. When the train reached Bath, Browne was taken to hospital and an operation was performed to remove a bullet.
