= Freddy Gardner =

British musician (1910–1950)

Freddy Gardner

Frederick Gardner (23 December 1910 – 26 July 1950) was a British jazz and dance band saxophonist during the 1930s and 1940s.

== Early life ==
Gardner's father sold artist's materials, while his mother was a dressmaker. He took up the saxophone at 15 to help to alleviate asthma. After minimal coaching, he formed the semi-professional New Colorado Band in 1928, and a year later, while working as an office clerk, entered the band in a contest at Chelsea Town Hall and won. He was spotted by the founding editor of Melody Maker magazine, who was distributing the prizes, and a year later Gardner secured his first professional position.

== Early career ==
In 1933, Gardner was taken under the wing of Ray Noble and recorded with the New Mayfair Orchestra. He played in London clubs when working with Sidney Lipton's Orchestra and at the Mayfair Hotel with Bert Firman's band and with Billy Bissett. Gardner became a prolific session musician, doubling on all the reeds, although his main instrument was alto saxophone.

He played on recordings by Benny Carter, Ray Noble, Valaida Snow, Jay Wilbur Buck Washington, and John W. Bubbles. from 1936 to 1937 he performed on the radio, led small groups, and his Swing Orchestra, which included Ted Heath. Many arrangements were scored by Gardner.

== World War II ==
During World War II, Gardner joined the Royal Naval Patrol Service as a diesel engineer under Eastern Command. An official dance band for the RNPS called the Blue Mariners was led by George Crow. Their home was the Sparrow's Nest at Lowestoft, an entertainment venue appropriated by the Royal Navy. Other musicians in the band were drawn from the orchestras of Henry Hall and Ambrose. Gardner was regularly given special leave to continue his recording and broadcasting. Other recordings at this time were made under the band name Freddie Gardner and his Mess Mates.

== Freelance work ==
After the war, he continued with extensive freelance work, including as a soloist with the Peter Yorke Concert Orchestra. This band was formed for the BBC, and appeared in weekly radio programmes, such as The Starlight Hour and Sweet Serenade. Gardner's 78 rpm recording of "I Only Have Eyes for You" was recorded on 29 April 1948, two years before his death.

== Death ==
Gardner loved golf, all forms of transport, and was a keen modeller. He was taken ill while mending his son Robin's bicycle in the garden of his Brooke Street home in London. An hour later, at St Mary's Hospital, he died of a stroke on 26 July 1950 at the age of 39. Many in the profession attended his memorial service; he was buried in Willesden Cemetery.
