= Eva Taylor =

American blues singer and stage actress (1895–1977)

Background information
- Also known as: Irene Gibbons
- Born: Irene Joy Gibbons; January 22, 1895; St. Louis, Missouri, U.S.
- Died: October 31, 1977 (aged 82) Mineola, New York, U.S.
- Genres: Jazz; blues
- Occupations: Singer; actress
- Years active: 1930s–1940s; 1960s–1970s
- Labels: Black Swan; Columbia; Vocalion; Edison; Okeh
- Spouse: Clarence Williams (m. 1921; died 1965)

Eva Taylor (January 22, 1895 — October 31, 1977) was an American blues singer and stage actress.

== Life and career ==
She was born Irene Joy Gibbons in St. Louis, Missouri, as one of twelve children. On stage from the age of three, Taylor toured New Zealand, Australia and Europe before she was in her teens. She also toured extensively with Josephine Gassman and Her Pickaninnies, a vaudeville act. She settled in New York City by 1920. There she established herself as a performer in Harlem nightspots. Within a year she wed Clarence Williams, a producer (hired by Okeh Records), publisher, and piano player. The newlyweds worked together on radio and recordings. They recorded together through 1930s. Their legacy includes numbers made as the group Blue Five in the mid-1920s, which included the jazz clarinetist and saxophonist Sidney Bechet, trumpet virtuoso Louis Armstrong, and such singers as Sippie Wallace and Bessie Smith.

In 1922 Taylor made her first record for the African-American-owned Black Swan Records, which billed her as "The Dixie Nightingale." She recorded dozens of blues, jazz and popular sides for Okeh and Columbia throughout the 1920s and 1930s. She adopted the stage name Eva Taylor, but she also worked under her birth name in Irene Gibbons and her Jazz Band.

She was part of the Charleston Chasers, the name given to a few all-star studio ensembles who recorded between 1925 and 1930. In 1927, Taylor appeared on Broadway in Bottomland, a musical written and produced by her husband, which lasted for twenty-one performances. In 1929 she had her own radio show on NBC's Cavalcade. She then worked for many years on radio station WOR, in New York (guesting on Paul Whiteman's radio show in 1932).

Taylor stopped performing during the 1940s. She returned to performing in the mid-1960s, after her husband's death, and toured in Europe.The last one was 1976 to Stockholm, Sweden, where she performed at the Pawnshop together with well known local musicians and mostly sang the famous songs from the start of her career with Clarence Williams Blue Five. At least one performance is recorded (Kenneth Records, Opus3 Records).

== Death ==
Taylor died from cancer in 1977 in Mineola, New York. She was interred next to her husband, Clarence Williams, under the name Irene Joy Williams in Saint Charles Cemetery, in Farmingdale, New York.

Their son, Clarence Williams, Jr. (1923–1976) was the father of the actor Clarence Williams III.

Their daughter Joy Williams (1931–1970) was a singer and actress, performing under the stage name Irene Williams.

== Discography ==
Year	Title	Genre	Label
1996	Not Just the Blues	Jazz, blues	Pearl
1996	Complete Recorded Works, Vol. 1 (1922–1923)	Jazz, blues	Document
1996	Complete Recorded Works, Vol. 2 (1923–1927)	Jazz, blues	Document
1996	Complete Recorded Works, Vol. 3 (1928–1932)	Jazz, blues	Document
1997	Edison Laterals 4	Jazz, blues	Diamond Cut
