= Art Christmas =

Canadian jazz and dance band musician

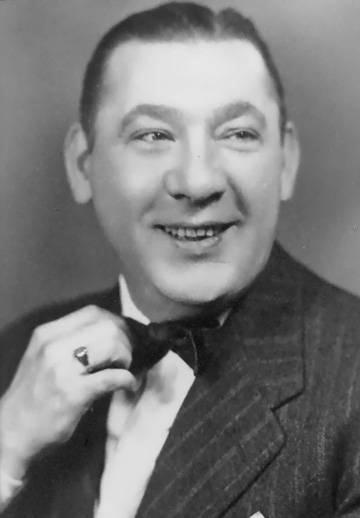
- Born: December 22, 1905; Kingston, Ontario, Canada
- Died: September 24, 1961 (aged 55); Blind River, Ontario, Canada
- Occupations: Dance band and jazz musician

Art Christmas (December 22, 1905 – September 24, 1961) was a Canadian dance band and jazz musician. For many years during the exciting dance band and jazz era of the 1920s, 1930s and 1940s, Art Christmas was often said to be Britain's leading saxophone player and multi-instrumentalist. In the 1930s and 1940s, young musicians in their teens and early twenties would follow Art all over Britain listening to him play and trying to copy his style, especially on alto saxophone.

== Beginning ==
Art's professional music career really started when he was 19 years old. He left Canada to play trumpet with the Dumbells Orchestra, touring all over the United States and then on to Britain. While in Britain, he was given the opportunity to play trumpet with Paul Specht's Canadian Club Orchestra in 1926 and really never looked back. The Melody Maker Magazine detailed this orchestra's strengths by saying: "A ten-piece combination, its members, who are all Canadians, between them account for thirty-five different instruments. There are three vocalists in the outfit. Art Christmas, the first trumpet, is also a red-hot 'dirt' sax player."

Still in Britain, Art went on to play with the New Prince's Toronto Band also in 1926. This band was the resident band at the New Prince's restaurant in Piccadilly. The band was made up of fellow Canadians and was directed by Hal Swain. It was when Hal Swain left the band, that at Alfie Noakes' behest, Art joined and took Hal Swain's place. The band was about to embark on a continental tour but first took some time fulfilling a recording contract again for Columbia. The publication British Dance Bands on Record shows Art playing tenor sax but he doubled on alto sax and trumpet. This band had recorded about 50 titles since November 1924, but just one more session took place on February 25, 1926, while Art was with them. The band actually left for the continent in August 1926 and by now consisted of Dave Caplan (banjo), Les Allen (clarinet, tenor sax), Ken Kenney (drums), Art Lousley (trumpet), Jack Collins (trombone), John Whittaker (bass), Laurie Day (piano) and of course Art Christmas who played mostly alto sax but doubled on tenor sax, clarinet, trombone and trumpet.(This likely started Art thinking of trying to make a name for himself as a multi instrumentalist even as early as the 1920s). Eventually this band became known as "The Toronto Band from Canada, featuring Art Christmas" and from about the first week in September they played at the Faun des Westens in Berlin. During November they also appeared at The Scala Theatre, assisting the dance pair Annette Mills and Bobby, who were demonstrating the Charleston dance. While in Berlin, Germany, the band recorded about 56 titles for Deutsche Grammophon/Polydor. This band had a very strong jazz component thanks mainly to Art Christmas' style. The German discographer Horst Lange compared it to the California Ramblers in his "Jazz in Deutschland: die deutsche Jazz-Chronik", noting that Art Christmas and other members of the band were familiar with all styles and could play with this special 'American feeling' which pure European musicians and bands were lacking. One of this band's few surviving recordings "I'm Sitting On Top Of The World", is a vigorous effort in the "hot dance" genre and according to the book 'The Lost History Of Jazz In Canada by Mark Miller', ".......is distinguished by Art Christmas' alto saxophone solo." Horst Lange's book Discography Of German Dance Music shows the personnel of the band changing considerably, with only Art Christmas, Les Allen, Dave Caplan and Ken Kenney remaining from the band which left Britain. Art worked extensively in Britain and Europe during the late 1920s and led his own band in Budapest, Berlin and London. He was with the Savoy Orpheans for a brief time and then joined Billy Mason in 1930. Art played and recorded with Percival Mackey and Dave Frost during the latter half of 1931 and was now playing baritone sax as well as the other instruments with these groups.

== Art's big break ==
Art's big break came when he joined the Roy Fox Band in February 1933, staying with this band until 1938. It was while he was with The Roy Fox Band, that Art Christmas became a household name around the music scene in both Britain and Europe. The British music magazine Melody Maker referred to Art as "...the most sought after musician in England" and Art soon became billed as Britain's 'Leading sax and multi-instrumentalist' as he not only played lead alto sax for Roy Fox but was often featured on trumpet, trombone, xylophone, drums, piano and even a routine with the bagpipes and sousaphone.....He didn't just play these other instruments but mastered them nearly to the same degree as he had the alto sax and clarinet.

In 1938 Melody maker Magazine declared that "Art Christmas' alto sax playing is distinguished by a daringly virtuoso style and inventive technique that displays a harmonic and rhythmic sophistication well in advance of his time..."

After Roy Fox was forced to disband due to health problems in 1938, Art worked with Arthur Rosebery from 1938 to 1939, Sid Millward's "Nitwits" and Joe Ferrie in 1939, before joining Jack Jackson (playing with the Jackson band on one recording session in November of that year). From 1940 until late 1946, Art played with his dear friend Jack Payne. The Jack Payne band was just too busy (with BBC shows every week and public performances all over Britain) to do much recording between 1940 and 1944 but there was a session in 1945 that Art played.

== For The Fun of It ==
After Jack Payne turned impresario and launched a new variety show called "For The Fun of It", he asked Art to join up with Donald Peers, Frankie Howerd and Max Bygraves along with many other entertainers. Thus Art's multi instrumentalist stage act began and Art teamed up with his wife Maisie (a dancer and show girl), and "For The Fun of It" opened at the Sheffield Empire in Sheffield for sixteen weeks, followed by a different major city every week.

== Command Performance ==
After the extensive run of "For The Fun of It", Art did some ice shows and some Pantomimes and also led his own "Foulharmonic Orchestra" for the show "Ignorance Is Bliss". One of Art's fondest memories was the performance of "Cinderella" for King George VI and Queen Elizabeth at the Palladium in London.

== Warburton Arms ==
In 1952, Art was searching for his next adventure and much to the disappointment of his many fans decided to retire from show business and become a publican. He bought "The Warburton Arms" (now known as London Fields) an east end pub in Hackney, London. Art had been away from his mother and father for nearly 30 years and soon after he bought the pub in Hackney, his father died. In 1954, determined not to let his mother die without seeing her again, Art sold the pub and moved back to Canada with his wife Maisie and son Art Jr.

== Canada 1954 ==
After returning to Canada, Art performed a great deal around Kingston and Toronto with his own band from 1955 to 1958 when he decided to try his hand at teaching music at the high school level. He moved to Blind River, Ontario, again with his wife Maisie and his son Art, and taught until his death in 1961 in both Blind River, Ontario and Elliot Lake, Ontario. Although Art was enjoying his new teaching career a great deal, he still had the desire and drive to play. This time he played in and around Elliot Lake, Ontario and for the first time Art Jr. was at his side. The experience of playing with his 15-year-old son was the biggest thrill Art had ever experienced in his entire musical career. This experience was short lived however. Art died a year later.
