= Everything Is Rhythm =

1936 film

- American poster
- Directed by: Alfred J. Goulding
- Written by: Jack Byrd; Syd Courtenay
- Produced by: Joe Rock; Stanley Haynes
- Starring: Harry Roy; Dorothy Boyd; Clarissa Selwynne
- Cinematography: Ernest Palmer
- Edited by: Sam Simmonds
- Music by: Cyril Ray
- Production company: Joe Rock Productions
- Distributed by: Associated British Film Distributors; Astor Pictures (US)
- Release date: 11 June 1936
- Running time: 73 minutes
- Country: United Kingdom
- Language: English

Everything Is Rhythm (also known as Floor Show) is a 1936 British musical film directed by Alfred J. Goulding and starring Harry Roy, Princess Pearl and Dorothy Boyd. It was written by Jack Byrd and Syd Courtenay. It was shot at Elstree Studios near London with sets designed by art director George Provis.

It was released in America in 1940 by Astor Pictures.

== Plot ==
Harry Wade and his band are playing at a luxurious hotel, and Harry falls in love with Princess Paula of Monrovia. When the Monrovian authorities hear of the romance, they disapprove and whisk Paula back to Monrovia. Heartbroken, Harry goes off on a world tour, and ends up in Monrovia where he rescues Paula from an unwelcome arranged marriage.

== Cast ==
- Harry Roy as Harry Wade
- Princess Pearl as Princess Paula
- Dorothy Boyd as Grethe von Essen
- Clarissa Selwynne as Miss Mimms
- Robert English as Duke
- Gerald Barry as Count Rudolf
- Phyllis Thackery as Lucy
- Bill Currie as George Wade
- Agnes Brantford as Mrs Wade
- Syd Crossley as waiter
- Arthur Clayton as manager
- Ivor Moreton as Joe
- Dave Kaye as Sam

== Reception ==
Kine Weekly wrote: "Based on the spectacular rise to fame and colourful romance of Harry Roy, popular maestro of radio and vaudeville, this comedy musicale hands out first-rate light entertainment for the masses. The happy-go-lucky story accepts fictional latitude with discretion, the star couples versatility with personality, the song numbers are tuneful, and the treatment, in spite of the imitative moments, reveals a shrewd regard for showmanship.

The Daily Film Renter wrote: "Highlight is spirited work of Roy and melody men, who play with zest in series of attractive settings that range over entire globe. Tuneful numbers, amusing comedy episodes, and dash of Ruritanian dramatics are additional angles. Subject is excellent offering for popular patrons, while pulling powers of Roy need no emphasis. Harry Roy and his Band emerge with unmistakable success in this musical confection designed to exploit their talents, while the maestro himself reveals a nice sense of comedy in addition to his ability with the baton."

Variety wrote: "Manages to be fairly amusing although its chances on this side are dubious in view of cast names who are unknown. ... Band is all right rather than sensational, and some of the song-and-dance numbers with Roy, Bill Currie and others, plus numerous bits, are hardly more than passable."
