= Bluin' the Black Keys =

"Bluin' the Black Keys"

"Bluin' the Black Keys" is a "piano novelty" composed by Arthur Schutt, an early jazz pianist and arranger. It was issued by Robbins-Engel in 1926, and was one of the few published novelties issued by Arthur Schutt. Featuring extreme chromaticism and unusual syncopation it is particularly difficult for a novelty composition. Though never recorded by its composer, it has been recorded in recent years by pianists such as Tony Caramia, George Hicks, and Brian Holland.
