= Dave Shepherd =

English jazz clarinettist and bandleader (1929–2016)

- Born: David Joseph Shepherd; 7 February 1929; Walthamstow, London, England
- Died: 15 December 2016 (aged 87) Hampshire, England
- Genres: Jazz; Swing
- Occupations: Clarinettist; Bandleader
- Instrument: Clarinet

David Joseph Shepherd (7 February 1929 – 15 December 2016) was an English jazz clarinettist and bandleader.

== Biography ==
Shepherd was born in Walthamstow, London, England, to Cecilia (née Sadgrove), a machinist, and Joseph Shepherd, a semi-professional piano player whose other job was working for the local gas company.

Shepherd began on piano before switching to clarinet at the age of 16 in 1945. He studied under a clarinettist from the Hamburg State Opera Orchestra while stationed in Hamburg after World War II. Upon his return to England he played with Reg Rigden (1950), Joe Daniels and his 'Hotshots' (1951–53), and Freddy Randall (1954–55). He played with Billie Holiday and Gerry Mulligan on their tours of Britain. Shepherd played in New York City in 1956 with Ted Kotick, then returned to England to play with Jazz Today Unit (1956–57) and with the Jazz at the Philharmonic (1957). Shepherd also played with Mary Lou Williams several times in the 1950s.

In the 1960s and 1970s, he played with Randall again and with Teddy Wilson, as well as at the Montreux Jazz Festival in 1973 and in South Africa in 1975. During the late 1960s and early 1970s, Shepherd was heard more on radio, with his quartet used on BBC Radio 2's Jimmy Young programme, as well as Round Midnight, Breakfast Special and Music While You Work.

Shepherd's career was centred in the UK, and he worked regularly with trombone player Roy Williams, Len Skeat and many more. He was a frequent guest, with his line up called The Dave Shepherd Quintet, on BBC Radio 1's Sounds of Jazz, introduced by the presenter Peter Clayton during the mid-1970s and broadcast on Sunday evenings. The sessions were recorded at the BBC's Maida Vale Studios earlier in the week. Shepherd based his style on Benny Goodman, and was praised for his accuracy and "unfailing swing and a quality of musical elegance".

He performed with Peter Boizot's Pizza Express All Stars Band at the Pizza Express Jazz Club from 1980 to 1999. Shepherd led several of his own bands, and did extensive work producing music for film and television. He continued to solo and make guest appearances until shortly before his death on 15 December 2016, in the Macmillan Unit of Christchurch Hospital, Hampshire. He has been described by fellow jazz musician Digby Fairweather as "Britain's greatest swing clarinettist since 1948".

== Personal life ==
Shepherd was married twice. His first marriage was to jazz vocalist Jo Searle, with whom he had a daughter Rochelle; the union ended in divorce. In 1966, aged 37, he married his second wife, Mary Evans. Both Evans and Rochelle survived him.
