= Stars in Battledress =

Stars in Battledress (SiB) was an organisation of entertainers who were members of the British Armed Forces during World War II.

== History ==
In Britain, during the Second World War, entertainment was considered an essential to keep morale high. In 1939 ENSA was organised by Basil Dean to send groups of entertainers to factories and military camps. The artists in ENSA were initially civilians and consequently could not be sent to areas were fighting was occurring. This did not mean that they were in places where there was no danger from enemy action—the whole of Britain was a war zone due to the air raids. Later ENSA performers were commissioned as officers.

In order to get concert parties to forward areas, Stars in Battledress was formed. Talent existing in serving members of the army and ATS was transferred and sent to perform in any location, even on the edge of a battlefield. Colonel Basil Brown, together with Major Bill Alexander and Captain George Black (son of the impresario George Black) started up the organisation. As all the members of the concert parties were in the Armed Forces of Britain, there was no restriction of the location of concerts.

Stars in Battledress encompassed all three services. The RAF had a group called the RAF Gang Show, which was organised by Ralph Reader (who had in the pre-war years produced the Boy Scout Gang Show). The Navy also produced many concert parties that performed both afloat and in onshore venues.

SIB was directed during the war by Frank Chacksfield. It also included the popular band leader Bert Firman.

Stars in Battledress is frequently referred to as an Army "concert party troupe". It was very much more than that and had a considerable number of companies performing at various locations at the same time. Its official title was the War Office (forerunner of the Ministry of Defence) Central Pool of Artistes which was based in Upper Grosvenor Street, London. This was the first war in which there was an official military entertainment unit. Shows rehearsed at studios nearby and went on a shake-down tour of units, including AA sites, in the London area before going out on more extensive tours abroad or in the UK.

Only other ranks were allowed to be in the cast. Officers had to be producers.

Comedian, Sergeant Charlie Chester, was a major performer and in charge of the script-writing department. He was reputed to have taken a company abroad on the heels of the troops in the D-Day landings. Among his company was Arthur Haines who had developed his comic skills while serving in the Royal Engineers, and with whom he did a double act. While near Caen, northern France, Arthur pointed to a trench full of mud and scores of tiny frogs. He told Charlie: "Nothing would get me into that." At that moment, a German plane appeared, raking the ground with its machine guns and Arthur promptly dived into the trench from which he emerged covered in mud and frogs.

Haines joined Charlie in the BBC radio series Stand Easy which developed from the Army show and ran from 1946 to 1949 and Arthur went on to further success including the Arthur Haynes show in the early sixties.

As it became clear that Germany had lost the war, more SIB companies were formed. Among them was Going Places with Lieutenant Desmond Llewellyn, who played Q in the James Bond films after the war, as producer, and Sergeant Wally Huntley, in charge on the road. Going Places had eight soldiers and two ATS members. Walter Huntley's own story and of what it was like to be in an SIB show is told in his book Dummy Bullets, published by Trinity Mirror in 2008. As a cub journalist he had enlisted in the Territorial Army in 1939 and was mobilised at the start of the war with the 149th Regiment, Royal Horse Artillery, in Hoylake, then in Cheshire. Because the Army had so few soldiers who could do shorthand and typing he was quickly posted to the regimental office.

Huntley had been an amateur ventriloquist since his school days and had acquired a full size walking dummy, whom he enlisted with him! They were soon involved in troop shows. As the Army had even fewer ventriloquists than shorthand writers he eventually became a full-time entertainer with SIB and spent most of the war "talking to myself." His dummy, Gunner Jimmy Green, had a battledress made for him by the Army and developed his own persona in military circles. After media publicity in the newspapers and on radio and TV – including a live broadcast from the BBC Centre at Shepherd's Bush - he took up residence at the Imperial War Museum in London in 2009, where he is one of the exhibits.

== Post-war ==
Post war operation of entertainment for the forces was taken over by the Combined Services Entertainment.

== Some SiB artists who became well known after the war ==
- Janet Brown (actress, comedian, impressionist)
- Ian Carmichael (film actor)
- Frank Chacksfield (musician and composer)
- Charlie Chester (stage and radio comedian)
- Kenneth Connor (film actor)
- Michael Denison (film actor)
- Dick Emery (stage, radio and TV comedian)
- Bryan Forbes (actor, writer, film director)
- Nat Gonella (bandleader)
- Tony Hancock (TV comedian)
- Frankie Howerd (stage, TV and film comedian)
- Emanuel Hurwitz (violinist)
- Griffith Jones (film actor and later Royal Shakespeare Company stalwart)
- Elisabeth Kirkby (stage and TV actor, writer and producer)
- Alfred Marks (film actor, singer)
- Spike Milligan ('Goon', actor, writer)
- Stella Moray (actress)
- Jon Pertwee (film and TV actor)
- Robert Rietti (film, TV and radio actor)
- Cardew Robinson (comedian)
- Harry Secombe ('Goon', singer, comedian)
- Terry-Thomas (film actor)
- Faith Brook (stage and film actor)
