= Miff Mole =

American jazz trombonist and band leader (1898–1961)

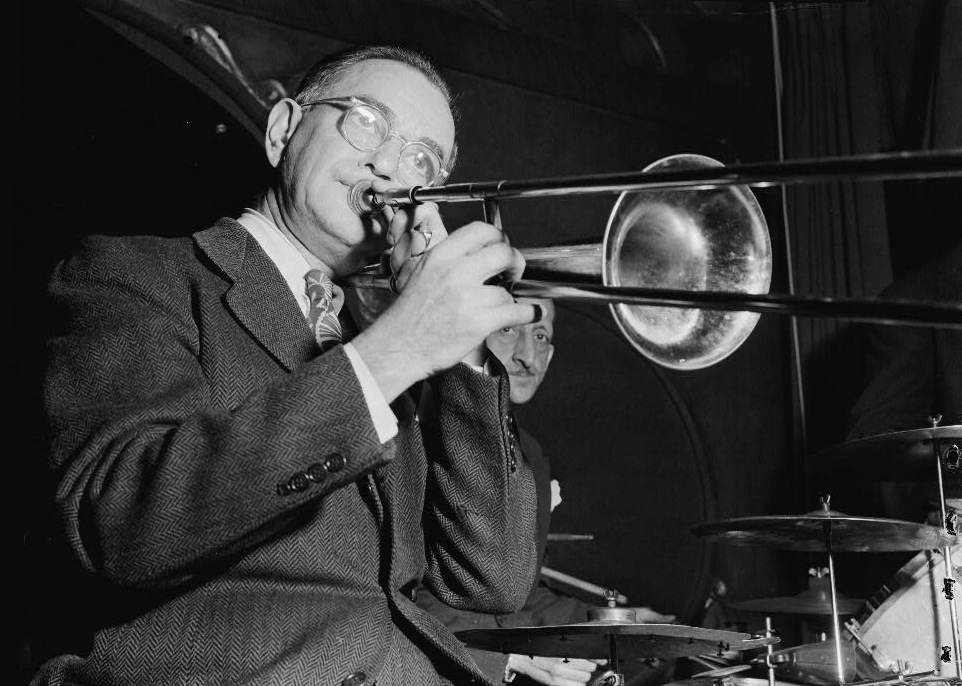
- Miff Mole at Nick's Tavern, c. June 1946; photo by William P. Gottlieb

Background information
- Born: Irving Milfred Mole; March 11, 1898; Roosevelt, New York, U.S.
- Died: April 29, 1961 (aged 63) New York City, New York, U.S.
- Genre: Jazz
- Occupation: Musician
- Instrument: Trombone

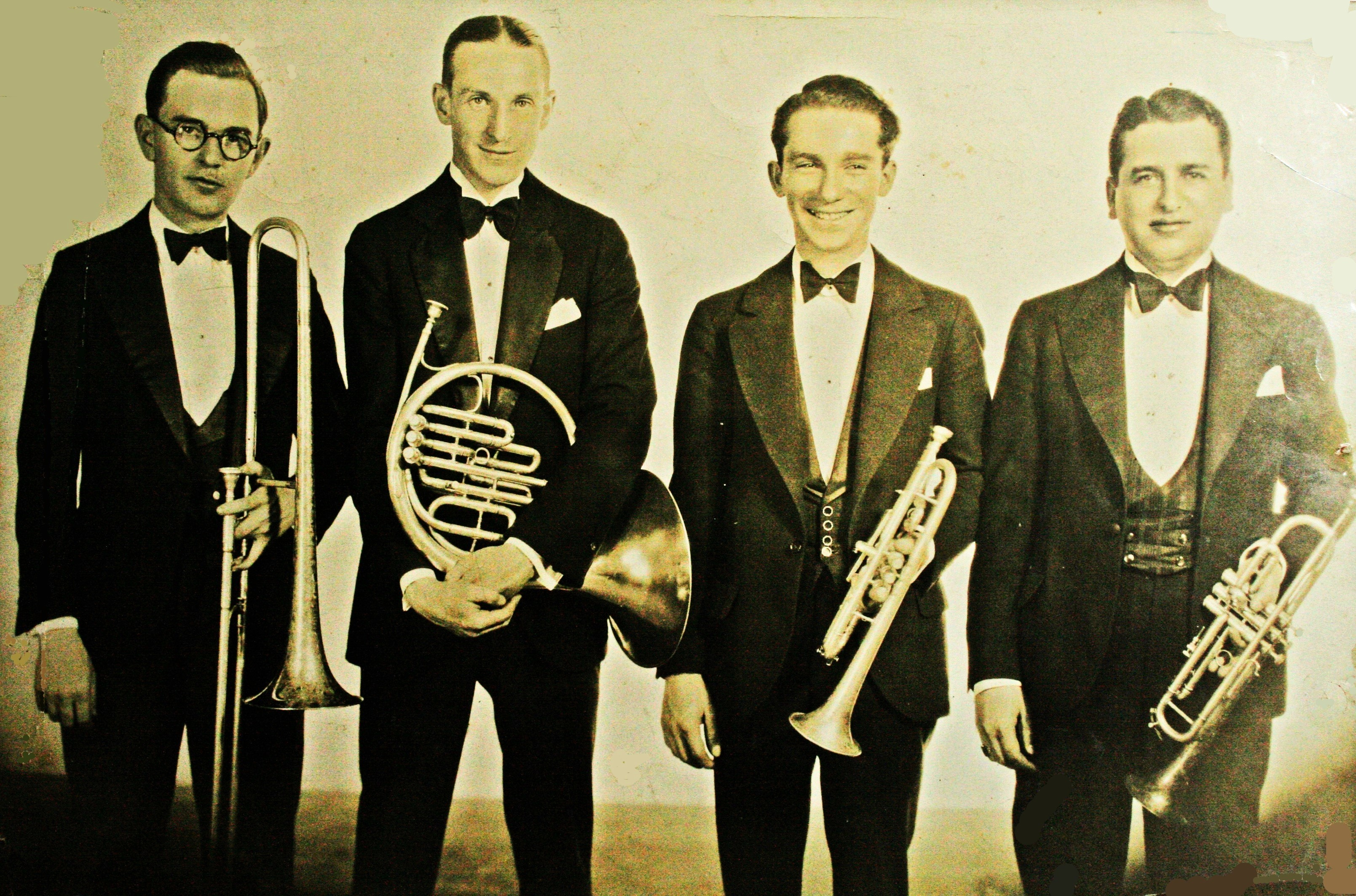
From left: Miff Mole, Dudley Fosdick, Red Nichols and Leo McConville, ca. 1926

Irving Milfred "Miff" Mole (March 11, 1898 – April 29, 1961) was an American jazz trombonist and band leader. He has been described as one of the greatest jazz trombonists and credited with creating "the first distinctive and influential solo jazz trombone style."

His major recordings included "Slippin' Around", "Red Hot Mama" in 1924 with Sophie Tucker on vocals, "Miff's Blues", and "There'll Come a Time (Wait and See)", which is on the film soundtrack to the 2008 movie The Curious Case of Benjamin Button.

== Career ==
Miff Mole was born in Greenwich Point, later renamed Roosevelt, Long Island, New York. He studied violin and piano as a child and switched to trombone when he was 15. From 1918 to 1919 Mole played in the Acme Sextett with Benny Krueger (saxophone), Ernie Holst (violin), and Edwin Taylor Williams (banjo). He played in Gus Sharp's orchestra for two years and in the 1920s became a significant figure on the New York scene: he was a member of the Original Memphis Five (1922), played with Ross Gorman, Roger Wolfe Kahn, Sam Lanin, Ray Miller and many others. His other activities, like those of many jazz musicians at the time, included working for silent film and radio orchestras. In 1926–29, he and trumpeter Red Nichols led a band called Miff Mole and His Little Molers. They recorded frequently until 1930.

Mole and his band backed Sophie Tucker, who was known as "The Last of the Red Hot Mammas" and who was one of the most popular singers of the 1910s and 1920s. They accompanied her on her 1927 Okeh recordings of "After You've Gone", "Fifty Million Frenchmen Can't Be Wrong", "I Ain't Got Nobody", and "One Sweet Letter from You". Mole and his band, which included Eddie Lang, Jimmy Dorsey, Red Nichols, and Vic Berton, also accompanied her for live performances.

From 1925 to 1929, Mole was identified with bands led by cornetist Red Nichols: The Red Heads, The Hottentots, The Charleston Chasers, The Six Hottentots, The Cotton Pickers, Red and Miff's Stompers, and especially Red Nichols and His Five Pennies. These bands recorded for the labels Perfect, Domino, Pathé, Edison, OKeh and Victor, though the Five Pennies name was used only for their recordings on Brunswick. The original Five Pennies band consisted of Nichols on cornet, Mole on trombone, Jimmy Dorsey on clarinet and alto sax, Eddie Lang on guitar, Arthur Schutt on piano, and Vic Berton (who came up with the name for the group) on drums, but over time the personnel changed and expanded. Among the musicians who passed through the Five Pennies were clarinetist Pee Wee Russell, violinist Joe Venuti, bass saxophonist Adrian Rollini, tuba and bass player Joe Tarto, trombonist Glenn Miller, and extra trumpeters such as Leo McConville and Charlie Teagarden.

When Jack Teagarden arrived in New York in 1928, he replaced Mole as the role model for trombonists, with a more legato, blues-oriented approach. Having started working for radio in 1927 (at WOR), Mole changed his focus to working with NBC (1929–1938). In 1938–1940, he was a member of Paul Whiteman's orchestra, but his style by then had changed under the influence of Teagarden. In 1942–1943, Mole played in Benny Goodman's orchestra, and between 1942 and 1947 he led dixieland bands. He worked in Chicago in 1947–1954.

Due to bad health, Mole played sporadically during his last years. He died in New York City on April 29, 1961. A benefit to raise money for his medical expenses was scheduled too late. He was interred in the family plot in Greenfield Cemetery, Hempstead, Long Island, New York.

Mole's solo style, which included octave-leaps, shakes, and rapid-fire cadenzas, had a profound effect on jazz trombone playing in his time. Among those who emulated Mole's playing were trombonists Bill Rank, Glenn Miller, Tommy Dorsey, and Jimmy Harrison.

His 1928 recording of "Shim-Me-Sha-Wabble" with the Little Molers (Okeh), was used in the soundtrack to the Russell Crowe movie Cinderella Man (2005). In 2008, his composition "There'll Come a Time (Wait and See)", written with Wingy Manone, was on the soundtrack to the Academy Award-nominated movie The Curious Case of Benjamin Button.

== Compositions ==
Miff Mole's compositions included "Slippin' Around", "There'll Come a Time (Wait and See)" with Wingy Manone, "Hangover" with Red Nichols, "Worryin' the Life Out of Me" with Frank Signorelli and Sidney Keith 'Bob' Russell, and "Miff's Blues".

== Discography ==
- 1927–00: The Chronological (Classics, 2002)
- 1928–37: The Chronological (Classics, 2003)
- 1944.02: Miff Mole and his World Jam Session Band, 1944 (Jazzology, 1982) – radio transcriptions
- 1944–00: Bobby Hackett / Miff Mole at Nicks 1944 (Commodore, 1985) – Miff Mole and His Nicksielanders only in the six tracks of B-side
- 1945.03: Manhattan Masters, 1954 (Manhattan)
- 1951–00: Dixieland at Jazz Ltd, Vol. 1 (Atlantic, 1952) – 10″ LP
- 1950–56: Doorway to "Dixie" (Argo, 1957)
- 1959.11: Aboard the Dixie Hi-Flyer (Stepheny, 1959) – reissued as The Immortal Miff Mole (Jazzology, 1982)
