= After Many Years (1930 film) =

1930 British film by Lawrence Huntington

- Directed by: Lawrence Huntington
- Written by: Lawrence Huntington
- Produced by: Alvin Saxon
- Starring: Henry Thompson; Nancy Kenyon; Savoy Havana Band
- Production company: Savana Film
- Distributed by: Metro-Goldwyn-Mayer
- Release date: 7 February 1930
- Running time: 70 minutes
- Country: United Kingdom
- Language: English

After Many Years is a 1930 British crime film directed by Lawrence Huntington and starring Henry Thompson, Nancy Kenyon and the Savoy Havana Band. It was made as a quota quickie for release by MGM.

== Synopsis ==
A murdered policeman's son tracks down the murderer in Peru.

== Cast ==
- Henry Thompson
- Nancy Kenyon
- Savoy Havana Band

== Reception ==
Kine Weekly wrote: "Weak production, acting, photography, and characterisation leave only the plot to provide entertainment. A mild stimulus of interest may be felt by those with patience enough to follow a detailed story of a son's discovery of his father's murderer. ... The director has marshalled his events entirely without imagination. Characters are puppets; nevertheless up to the introduction of Alvarez as an important player, the action is brisk and clearly narrated. From then, however, the interest which has been concerned with Maitland as a law-breaker and agitator is switched to a new set of characters. The proofs of Maitland's second murder are very feeble."

Film Weekly wrote: "After Many Years ... is not likely to sweep the country like wildfire; but it interested me deeply, for two reasons. First, it is evidence of the extraordinary way in which amateur cinematography has spread to every section of the community; and, secondly, it indicates the result that may be achieved, with hardly any other resources than intelligence, energy, and enthusiasm. The picture has been made by one Laurie Huntington, drummer of the Savoy Havana Band, and his fellow bandsmen, in their own spare time (which occupied almost entirely for four years) and at their own expense – direction, photography, lighting, sets, costumes, editing – the whole enterprise. If some of the San Francisco exteriors are rather obviously Wimbledon, the performance, as an amateur effort, is highly creditable. When it enters the professional field it is inevitably outclassed. Anyway, if I had made it I should be proud."
