= Australia Will Be There =

Australia Will Be There or Auld Lang Syne - Australia Will Be There is an Australian patriotic song written in 1915 as Australian troops were sent abroad to fight the German and Ottoman forces in Europe and the Middle East. The song was composed by Walter William Francis, a Welshman who immigrated to Australia in 1913 due to bad health.

== History ==
The song is one of the more well-known WW1 patriotic songs known in Australia today. It was one of the songs that Australian troops marched to on their way to fight in battle.

== Lyrics ==
The song's lyrics makes reference to HMAS Sydney's sinking of the SMS Emden the year prior.

There are lots and lots of arguments
Going on today
As to whether dear old England
Should be brought into the fray
But all right-thinking people
Know well we had to fight
For the Kaiser’s funny business
It wants some putting right.
Rally 'round the banner of your country
Take the field with brothers o'er the foam
On land or sea
Wherever you be
Keep your eye on Germany
But England, home and beauty
Have no cause to fear
Should auld acquaintance be forgot
No, no, no, no, no!
Australia will be there
Australia will be there
You have heard about the Emden ship
Cruising all around
She was sinking British merchant men
Where'er they could be found
But one fine morning early
The Sydney hove in sight
She trained her guns upon them
And the German said ‘goodnight’
Rally 'round the banner of your country
Take the field with brothers o'er the foam
On land or sea
Wherever you be
Keep your eye on Germany
But England, home and beauty
Have no cause to fear
Should auld acquaintance be forgot
No, no, no, no, no!
Australia will be there
Australia will be there
