= Maurice Winnick =

English musician (1902–1962)

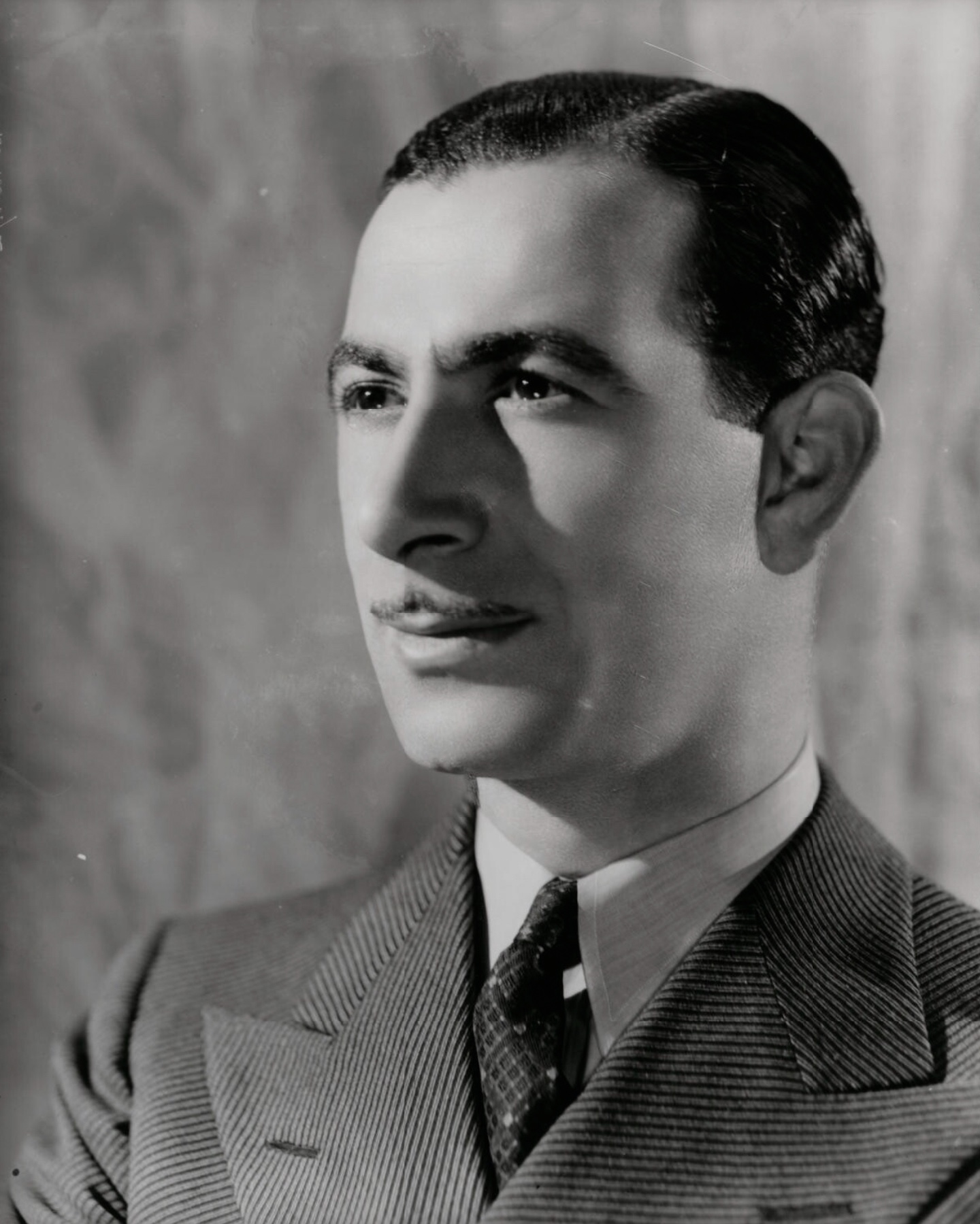
- Portrait of Maurice Winnick in 1934

Background information
- Born: Morris Winnick; 28 March 1902; Manchester, England
- Died: 26 May 1962 (aged 60)
- Genres: Big Band
- Occupation: Bandleader
- Instrument: Violin
- Labels: Regal, Panachord, Edison Bell Winner

Maurice Winnick (born Morris Winnick; 28 March 1902 – 26 May 1962) was an English musician and dance band leader of the British dance band era.

== Biography ==
Born in Manchester, Winnick studied violin at the Manchester College of Music, where he proved to be a "child prodigy". He took a job in a cinema orchestra, playing the accompaniment for silent films, and while still in his teens he became leader of a dance band on a transatlantic liner. Winnick formed his own small band in 1928, before moving to Nottingham to take over the city's Palais band from Jan Ralfini. He based his style of music on that of fellow band leader Guy Lombardo, and by the 1930s Winnick was performing regularly in several prestigious London venues including the Hammersmith Palais de Danse, the Carlton Hotel, and the San Marco Restaurant, with singer Sam Costa.

Winnick and Costa had a popular recording success with "A Little Bit Independent", and the band produced several recordings of dance band music with labels such as Regal, Panachord, and Edison Bell Winner. They also appeared in films of the 1930s, including Gay Love in 1934; their theme tune during this period was "The Sweetest Music This Side Of Heaven".

In 1939 Winnick took over from Harry Roy at London's Dorchester Hotel, but he was obliged to reduce his band to only 11 members. Nevertheless, he employed some of the best musicians of the period, including trombone player and future bandleader Ted Heath, trumpeter Bill Shakespeare and saxophonist Don Barrigo. He also hired top-class singers for his radio broadcasts, such as Al Bowlly and Dorothy Carless.

Winnick toured Europe and the Middle East with ENSA during the Second World War, but by the 1950s he realised that the popularity of big bands was in decline and turned his attention to promoting radio and television game shows for the rest of his life. Among his imports from America were the popular BBC shows Twenty Questions and What's My Line?

In 1954, Winnick was part of the Kemsley-Winnick consortium, which won the initial ITV weekend contracts for the Midlands and the North of England. However, shortly after the award of the contracts, the consortium lost its primary financial backer, Lord Kemsley, resulting in its collapse.
