= Harry Roy =

British clarinetist and dance band leader (1900–1971)

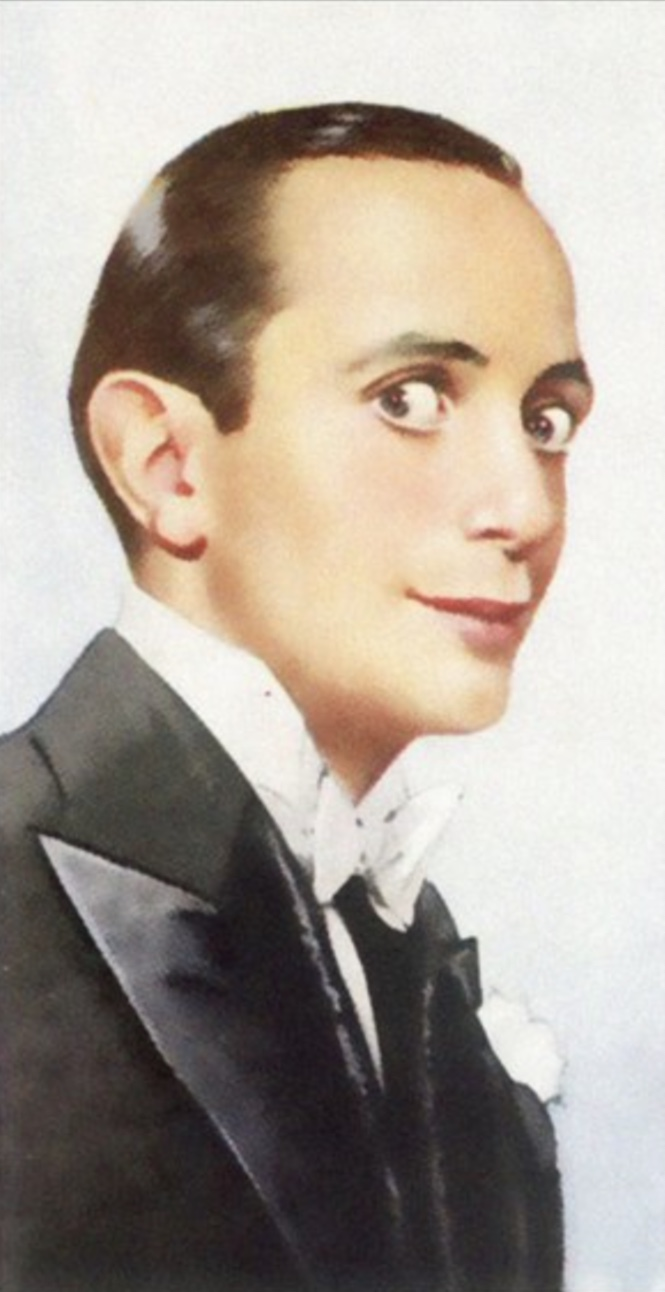
- Harry Roy, circa 1934.

Background information
- Born: Harris Litman; 12 January 1900; Stamford Hill, London, England
- Died: 1 February 1971 (aged 71) London
- Instrument: Clarinet

Harris Litman (12 January 1900 – 1 February 1971), known professionally as Harry Roy, was a British dance band leader and clarinet player from the 1920s to the 1960s. He performed several songs with suggestive lyrics, including "My Girl's Pussy" (1931), "She Had to Go and Lose It at the Astor" (1939), and "When Can I Have a Banana Again?" (1943).

== Life and career ==
Roy was born Harry Litman in Stamford Hill, London, England to a Jewish family and after learning piano from the age of seven, went on to study clarinet and alto saxophone at the age of 16. He and his brother Sidney formed a band which they called the Darnswells Dance Band, with Harry on saxophone and clarinet and Sidney on piano. During the 1920s, they performed in several prestige venues, such as the Alhambra and the London Coliseum, in bands such as the Original Lyrical Five and the Crichton Lyricals. They had a three-year residency at the Café de Paris, and toured South Africa, Australia and Germany.

By the early 1930s, Harry Roy was fronting his own band, the RKOlians and broadcasting from the Café Anglais and the Mayfair Hotel. In 1931, he wrote and sang "My Girl's Pussy", which has since been the subject of many cover versions and remakes. In 1935, he married Elizabeth Brooke (stage name: Princess Pearl), daughter of the White Rajah of Sarawak, with whom he appeared in two musical films, Everything Is Rhythm (1936) and Rhythm Racketeer (1937). Appearing in the former film were Roy's two pianists, Ivor Moreton and Dave Kaye. They had originally been part of Harry Roy's Tiger Ragamuffins, a smaller outfit composed of members of the main band, which also included drummer Joe Daniels. Moreton and Kaye left Roy's band in early 1936, going on to a successful career as piano duettists in their own right.

During the Second World War, Roy toured with the Tiger Ragamuffins. He was at the Embassy Club in 1942, and a little later, toured the Middle East, entertaining troops with singer Mary Lee. A popular wartime song by his band was "When Can I Have a Banana Again?" (1943).

In 1948, Roy travelled to the United States, but was refused a work permit. Returning to Britain, he reformed his band and scored a hit with his recording of "Leicester Square Rag".

By the early 1950s, the big band era had come to an end. Roy's band split up, but he still drifted in and out of the music scene. In the 1950s, he ran his own restaurant, the Diners' Club, but it was destroyed by fire. In 1969 Roy returned to music, leading a quartet in London's Lyric Theatre's show Oh Clarence and his own Dixieland Jazz Band resident during the summer at the newly refurbished Sherry's Dixieland Showbar in Brighton, but he was by then in failing health. He died in London in February 1971.

== Personal life ==
Roy was married twice, first to Elizabeth Brooke in 1935. After his divorce from Elizabeth Brooke in 1947, Roy married Sonia Stacpoole, a dancer at the Windmill Theatre in Soho during the 1940s
