= Fred Hartley =

Scottish pianist, conductor and composer

Fred Hartley (1905 – 8 April 1980) was a Scottish rhythm pianist, conductor, composer and arranger of light music best known for his waltz Rouge et Noir. He sometimes composed music under the pseudonym Iris Taylor.

== Early life ==
Hartley was born in Dundee in 1905, the son of conductor William Hartley director of the Dundee School of Music. He attended the Harris Academy in Dundee, and later attained a scholarship to the Royal Academy of Music.

== Career ==
Hartley made his first public broadcast as a solo pianist in 1925 and in 1931 went on to form his Novelty Quintet, which regularly made broadcasts on the BBC. In 1946, he was made Head of BBC Light Music.

Hartley composed mainly in the light music genre and his compositions were often featured on the BBC Light Programme. In addition to Rouge et Noir, compositions for orchestra include the Scherzetto for Children, The Hampden Roar, Alpine Festival, The Ball at Aberfeldy, Whispering Breeze, Hampden Road March and A Dream of Hawaii.

Hartley published several of his piano works under the name Iris Taylor, including Dreamy Afternoon, Cuckoo in Love, Twentieth Century Nocturne and Starry Night. Recordings of his compositions and arrangements were issued by the RAF Salon Orchestra in 2023.

== Personal life ==
Hartley was married to Gwenyth Marjorie. He died at his home, 3 Pulford Road, Leighton Buzzard, in April 1980, aged 74.
