= Joe Daniels (jazz drummer) =

South African-British Dixieland drummer (1909–1993)

- Born: Joseph Hyman Daniels; 9 March 1905; Zeerust, South Africa
- Died: 1 July 1993 (aged 88) Brent, London, England
- Genres: Jazz, Dixieland
- Occupations: Musician, bandleader
- Instruments: Drums
- Years active: 1922-1990

Joseph Hyman Daniels (9 March 1905 – 1 July 1993), was a British Dixieland drummer and performer whose career began in the early 1920s. Among his more popular numbers was "Experiments With Mice".

== Career ==
Daniels was born in Zeerust, South Africa. He left his native South Africa for England as a young boy and in 1922, at 14 years of age, was already part of the 1920s London club scene, playing in bands led by Harry and Burton Lester, Billy Mason and Fred Elizade.

Daniels played with Sid Roy (brother of Harry Roy), and formed his own band with trumpeter Max Goldberg in 1926.

Around 1930, he started recording as "Joe Daniel's Hot Shots" (with Billy Mason), and they became a popular recording band. Other members in 1937 were Bill Jones (trumpet), Albert Harris (clarinet and saxophone), Les Osbourne (trombone), Verne Lewis (piano), and John LeBor (bass). The band performed on early BBC radio shows many times, and recorded on Parlophone. Bobby King was often the group's vocalist.

At the outbreak of the Second World War, Daniels joined the Royal Air Force, where he organised an air force band, and produced shows for the troops. After the war and throughout the 1950s, 1960s and 1970s, he played in both small and in big bands, including recording under the name "Washboard Joe and His Scrubbers". Their recording of "I Love Onions" / "Paper Kisses" was released on Parlophone in 1955.

In 1957, he toured as the Big Dixie Land Group, appearing at such venues such as Swindon. The group members were; Tony Coe, Ron Winn, Roy Reynolds, Dom Francis, Alan Wickham, Brian Vaughan, Dennis Martin, Ken Wood, Bill Davey, Bill Dean, Roy Kunbrer and Fred Harrison. He also employed the English jazz clarinetist, Dave Shepherd.

Joe Daniels and the Hot Shots were the ballroom band for Butlin's Holiday Camp in Clacton during the mid-1960s, and appeared in the Viennese Ballroom most evenings. He often played to a full house and was in tune with the campers' frivolity: one of the most popular dances that got everyone on the floor was the "March of the Mods".

He continued to play until 1990, when one of his last jobs was working at the Savoy Hotel in London.

Joe Daniels died on 2 July 1993, in Northwood, Middlesex, England, at the age of 88.
