= Savoy Orpheans =

British dance band

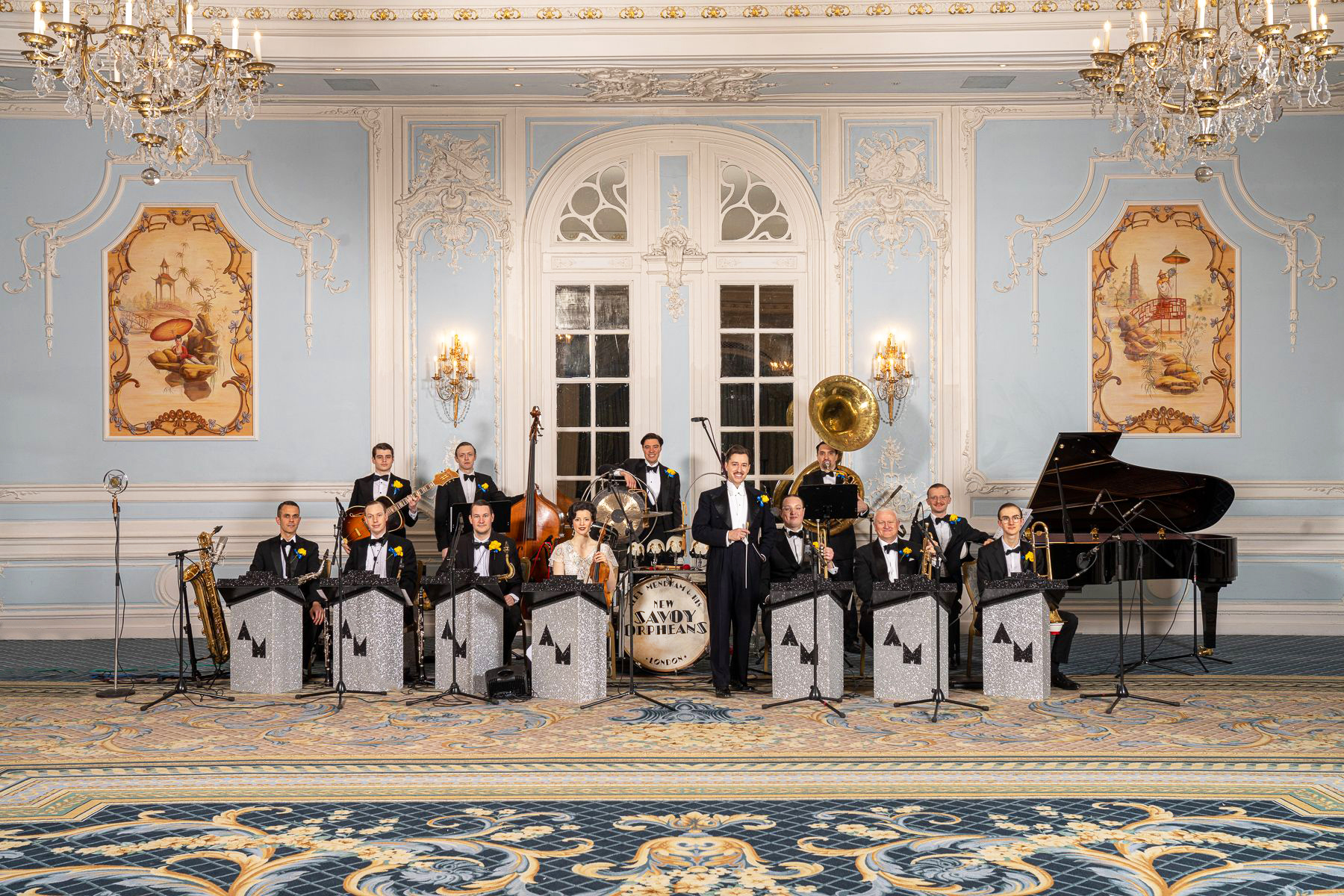
The new Savoy Orpheans in 2022

The Savoy Orpheans are a British dance band. Formed under the leadership of Debroy Somers in 1923, they were originally resident at the Savoy Hotel, London. They succeeded the Savoy Quartette (1916–1920) and outlasted the smaller Savoy Havana Band (1922–1927) into the 1930s, being completely reconstituted several times. They made numerous gramophone records and broadcast regularly. The original ensemble was disbanded in 1927. A successor band called the "Savoy Hotel Orpheans" continued until after the Second World War.

The title "Savoy Orpheans" was revived by the Savoy Hotel in April 2022, and Alex Mendham was appointed bandleader and musical director of the reformed group.

== Background ==
Rupert D'Oyly Carte, son of the founder of the Savoy, Richard D'Oyly Carte, took over as chairman of the hotel group in 1903. He aimed to offer the hotel's patrons the best possible comfort, cuisine and entertainment. Carte's own musical tastes leaned more towards the classical and light operatic (he was also proprietor of the D'Oyly Carte Opera Company), but he moved with the times and ensured that the Savoy continued to attract a fashionable clientele by a continuous programme of modernisation and the introduction of dancing in the large restaurants.

Live music was played by the Savoy Quartette between 1916 and 1920. They sang and played banjos in a mainly ragtime repertoire. From about 1910 ragtime had begun to supplant the traditional waltz, and as Compton Mackenzie put it in his history of the Savoy, "During the First World War one-steps, two-steps, foxtrots and hesitation waltzes were what the subalterns danced during their fugitive respites from the mud and blood of Flanders."

It is unclear what live music was performed at the hotel between the departure of the quartet and the introduction of the Orpheans in 1923, although it is known that the Savoy Havana Band played there from 1923. In those days people went down from the restaurant after dinner to dance in the hotel's ballroom and came up again to have supper: the fashion for dancing in the middle of the restaurant between courses came later.

== Foundation ==
The Savoy Orpheans were founded under the leadership of Debroy Somers, a former army bandmaster, who had been musical director of the hotel in the preceding years. The Times reported in October 1923:

A new rhythm in dance bands which is achieved by dividing the orchestra, one part of which sustains the four syncopated beats to the bar while the other section regularly emphasizes the two walk steps, is being introduced to London this season by the new Orpheans Band, which will open the winter dance season at the Savoy Hotel this week.

The best musicians were engaged to play in the Orpheans, who became reputedly the highest-paid dance band in the country. Carte called the original Orpheans and their colleagues in the Havana Band, "probably the best-known bands in Europe." His judgment was echoed by the music historian Brian Rust, who wrote in 1971 of the original Orpheans: "their very name personifies the Dancing Twenties … and their broad versatility ... made this imprint in a way that no band had done before and few have achieved since". The Savoy bands were the first British dance-bands to broadcast regularly, and were transmitted live by the BBC throughout the 1920s. They made hundreds of recordings for the gramophone.

On 15 June 1925, Somers conducted the Orpheans in the first British performance of George Gershwin's Rhapsody in Blue, alongside the Savoy Havana Band with the composer at the piano. The performance was broadcast live by the BBC. Among those who played in the band during the 1920s were Sylvester Ahola, Caroll Gibbons, Max Goldberg, Frank Guarente, Cyril Hellier and Teddy Sinclair.

Most of the Orpheans' work was in a wide range of modern dance music. The music writer Dick Hill writes that the Orpheans' ability to play "hot" dance music, when given the opportunity, is evident on many recordings: he instances their versions of "Hard-Hearted Hannah", "Alabamy Bound", "Blue Evening Blues", "Ain't That Too Bad?", "Static Strut", "Jig Walk", and "Vladivostock". For Hill they were pioneers of American dance music in Britain, not only for the tunes that they played, but because all the featured soloists were from America. The Orpheans and the Havana Band made more than 300 records between 1922 and 1927.

== Later ==
Members included Cyril Ramon Newton, who briefly assumed the leadership in 1926, Carroll Gibbons, who became musical director in 1927 and Rudy Vallee. The Orpheans and the Havana Band were not direct employees of the Savoy but were under the management of William de Mornys. He chafed at the refusal by the Savoy management to allow the bands to fulfil outside engagements and when his contractual arrangements with the hotel expired at the end of 1927 he disbanded both.

Attempted replacements – The New Savoy Orpheans under Batten and the Original Savoy Orpheans under Gibbons and Teddy Sinclair – survived less than a year (1928). Other groups were formed with the name "Savoy Orpheans", but were independent of the hotel, until Gibbons began another engagement there with the Savoy Hotel Orpheans (1931). Rust describes that ensemble as "a purely straight, typically smooth supper club band" that had a long and uneventful existence until the hotel dance-band era came to an end after the Second World War.

Gibbons continued as bandleader at the Savoy until 1950, when he became the hotel's director of entertainments until his death in 1954. His assistant, Ian Stewart, then took over as head of the hotel's music, retiring in 1978.

The title Savoy Orpheans was revived by the Savoy Hotel in April 2022, and Alex Mendham was appointed bandleader and musical director of the reformed group.

== Sources ==
- Gammond, Peter (1991). The Oxford Companion to Popular Music. Oxford: Oxford University Press. ISBN 0-19-280004-3.
- Hill, Dick (1993). Sylvester Ahola: The Gloucester Gabriel. Metuchen: Scarecrow Press. ISBN 0-8108-2625-9.
- McCarthy, Albert (1971). The Dance Band Era – The Dancing Decades from Ragtime to Swing: 1910–1950. Philadelphia: Chilton Book Co. ISBN 0-8019-5681-1.
- Mackenzie, Compton (1953). The Savoy of London. London: Harrap. OCLC 3029755.
