= George Elrick =

British musician (1903–1999)

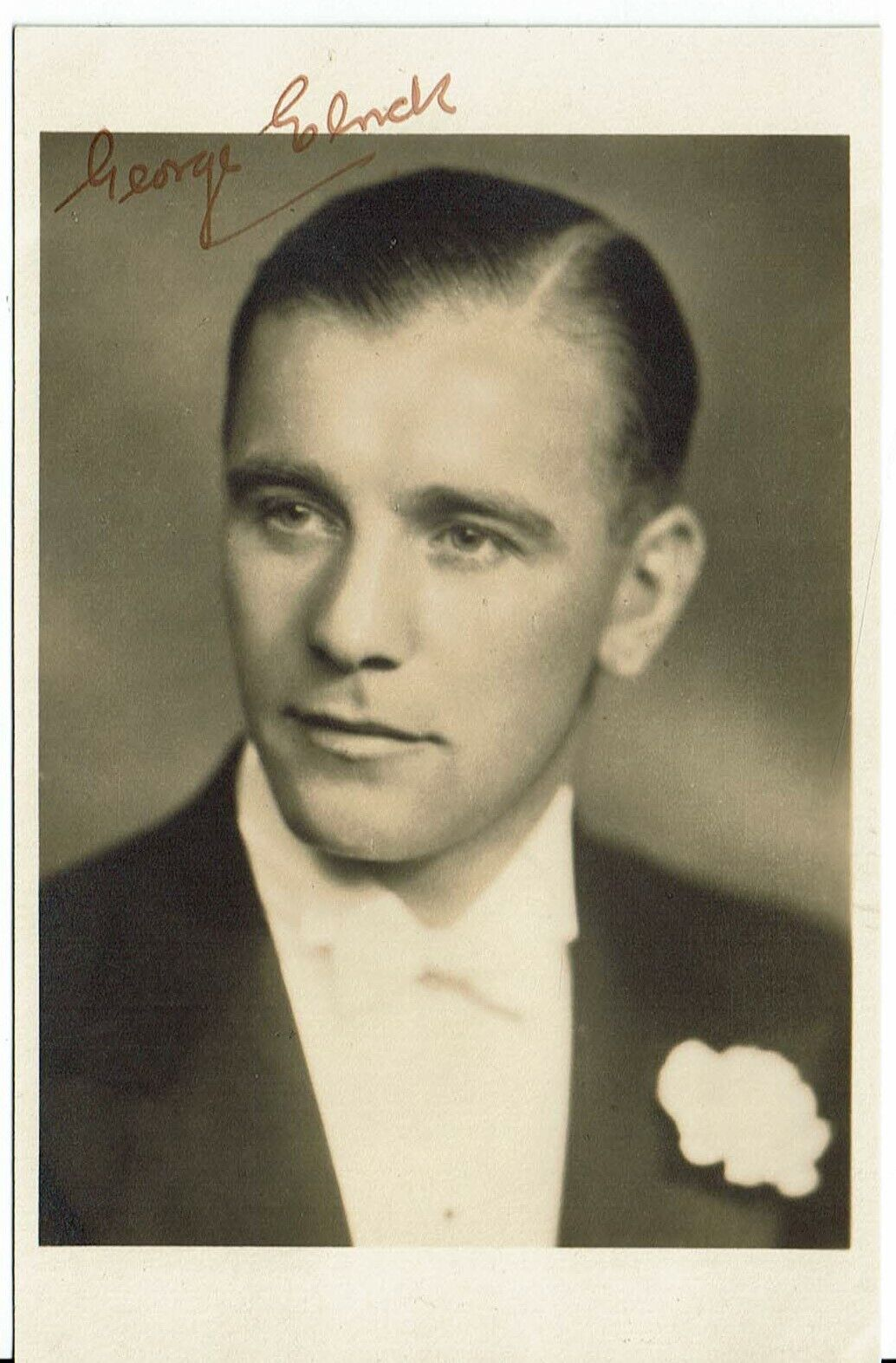

Background information
- Born: 29 December 1903; Aberdeen, Scotland
- Died: 15 December 1999 (aged 95)
- Occupations: Musician; impresario; radio presenter
- Years active: 1928–1979

George Connell Elrick (born George Elrick; 29 December 1903 – 15 December 1999), known as "The Smiling Voice of Radio", was a Scottish musician, impresario and radio presenter, perhaps best known for presenting the popular record request show Housewives' Choice during the 1950s and 1960s, as well as his recording of the song "I Like Bananas Because They Have No Bones".

== Biography ==
George Elrick was born in Aberdeen, Scotland, on 29 December, 1903. His first ambition was to be a doctor, but financial constraints prevented this. Still in his teens, he began playing drums for local dance bands, and by 1928 had formed his own band, the Embassy Band, which swept the prizes in the All-Scottish Dance Band Championship that year. Elrick turned professional and moved to London, where he became friends with the crooner Al Bowlly, and began singing himself. Elrick joined the Henry Hall orchestra as a vocalist and drummer, and their 1936 recording of "The Music goes Round and Round" made Elrick a star. In 1937, he left Hall to form his own band, and in 1939 began a solo career, which was moderately successful through the years of World War II.

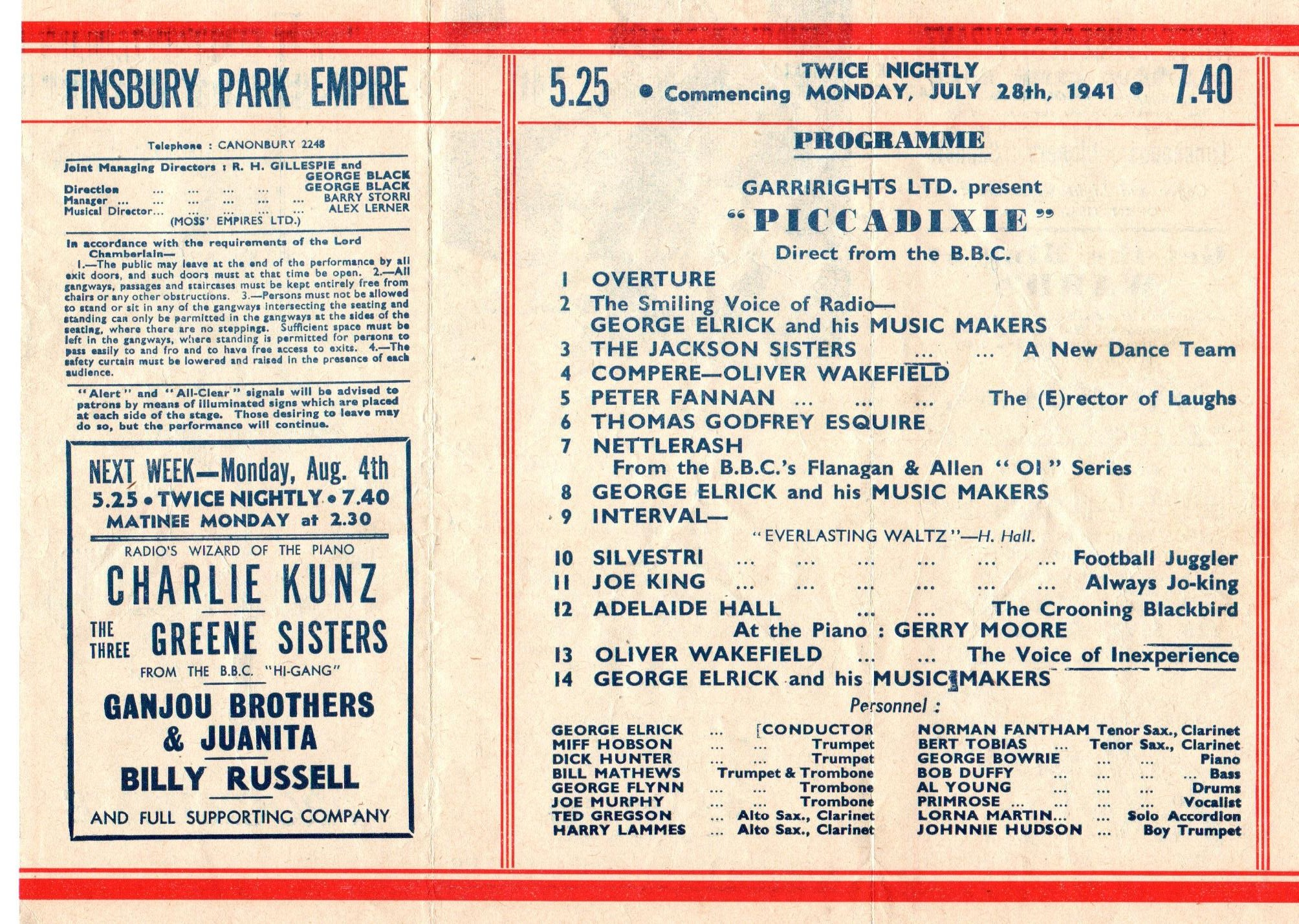
Piccadixie (featuring George Elrick) at the Finsbury Park Empire, London, 28 July 1941

In 1948, Elrick took a touring revue around Britain, and was asked by the BBC to stand in for two weeks as disc jockey on the morning record request show Housewives' Choice. The "temporary" job lasted almost twenty years, as Elrick's Scottish accent and liberal use of catchphrases became highly popular. Memorably, he would sign off each show by singing the words "I'll be with you all again tomorrow morning" to the (wordless) theme tune, and noting "This is Mrs Elrick's wee son George saying thanks for your company – and cheerio!".

In later years, Elrick became something of an impresario and acted as an agent for numerous musicians, such as Mantovani. He was a member of the Grand Order of Water Rats, and was also a life member of the Variety Club of Great Britain.

The singer Lena Martell was managed and produced by Elrick. This included a producing credit for her 1979 UK singles chart number one hit "One Day at a Time".

Elrick was married and had a son. He published an autobiography, Housewives' Choice – The George Elrick Story. He died on 15 December 1999, aged 95.
