= British dance band =

Genre of popular jazz and dance music

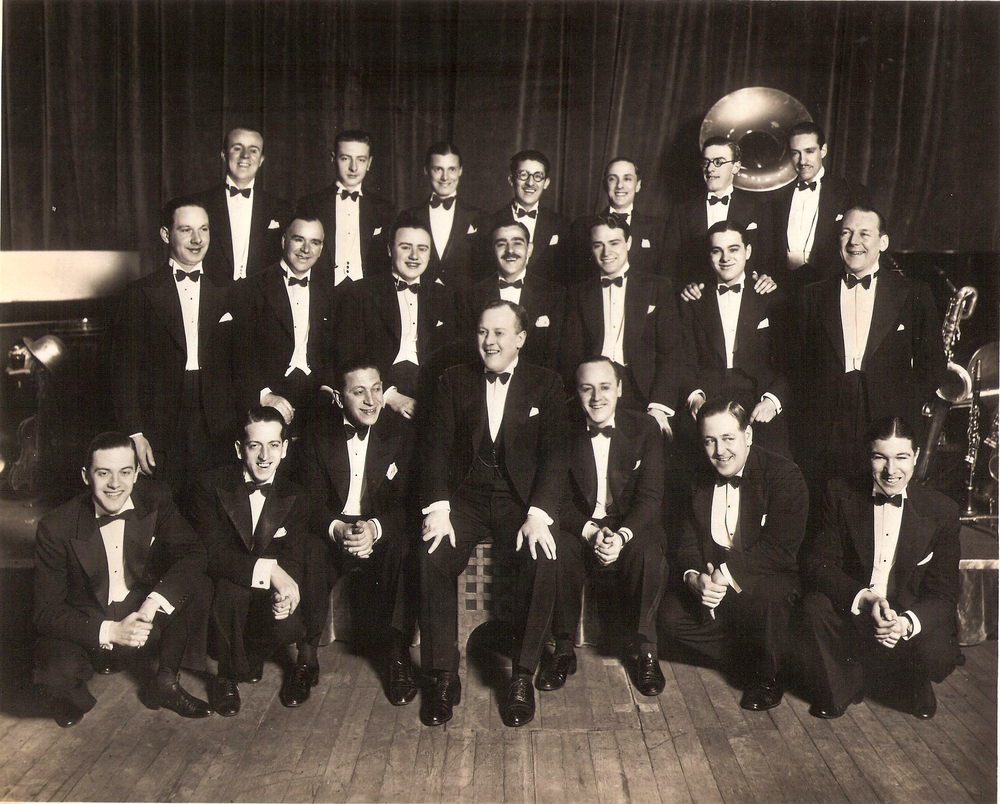
Jack Hylton and his Orchestra, c. early 1930s.

British dance band is a genre of popular jazz and dance music that developed in British dance halls and hotel ballrooms during the 1920s and 1930s, often called a Golden Age of British music, prior to the Second World War.

British dance bands of this era typically played melodic, good-time music that had jazz and big band influences but also maintained a peculiarly British sense of rhythm and style which came from the music hall tradition. Often, comedians of the day or music hall personalities would sing novelty recordings backed by well-known British dance band leaders. Some of the British dance band leaders and musicians went on to fame in the United States in the swing era.

Thanks to Britain's continuing ballroom dancing tradition and its recording copyright laws, British dance music of the pre-swing era still attracts a modest audience, which American dance music of the same period does not.

== Notable band leaders ==
In the mid-1930s, Lambert & Butler issued a series of cigarette cards depicting dance band leaders. The British leaders included are listed below.

- Bert Ambrose
- Billy Cotton
- Roy Fox
- Geraldo
- Carroll Gibbons
- Nat Gonella
- Henry Hall
- Jack Hylton
- Jack Jackson
- Charlie Kunz
- Sydney Kyte
- Brian Lawrance
- Sydney Lipton
- Joe Loss
- Ray Noble
- Jack Payne
- Harry Roy
- Debroy Somers
- Lew Stone
- Maurice Winnick
- Lou Preager

See List of British dance band leaders for a more comprehensive listing.

== Notable vocalists ==
Many popular singers rose to fame as vocalists on recordings by the British dance bands. They are not always attributed by name on the record label, apart from the description "with vocal refrain", but an experienced listener can often identify the voices of these otherwise anonymous singers. Famous British dance band vocalists included:

- Les Allen
- Al Bowlly
- Alan Breeze
- Sam Browne
- Elsie Carlisle
- Jack Buchanan
- Helen Clare
- Sam Costa
- Evelyn Dall
- Frances Day
- Peggy Dell
- Denny Dennis
- George Elrick
- Maurice Elwin
- Chick Henderson
- Alan Kane
- Mary Lee
- Anne Lenner
- Vera Lynn
- Pat O'Malley
- Bob and Alf Pearson
- Jack Plant
- Val Rosing
- Anne Shelton
- Dorothy Squires

== British service dance bands ==
The Squadronaires are a Royal Air Force band which became the best known of the British service dance bands during the Second World War, with hits like "There's Something in the Air" and "South Rampart Street Parade". They played at dances and concerts for service personnel, broadcast on the BBC and recorded on the Decca label. Many of the members formerly played as side men in Bert Ambrose’s band, and they continued to be popular after the war under the leadership of Ronnie Aldrich. Other British service dance bands included the Blue Mariners, the Blue Rockets and the Skyrockets.

== Notable venues ==
Cafés, clubs, hotels and restaurants in London noted for British dance band music during the Golden Age included:

- The Ambassadors Club, Conduit Street
- The Astoria Ballroom, 157, Charing Cross Road, WC2
- The Bat Club
- The Bag O'Nails, Kingly Street
- Berkeley Hotel, Piccadilly
- Café Anglais, Leicester Square
- Café de Paris, Coventry Street
- Carlton Hotel, 90, Belgrave Road, Victoria
- Casani Club, Imperial House, Regent Street
- Hotel Cecil, Strand
- Ciro's Club, Orange Street, off Haymarket
- Devonshire House, Piccadilly
- The Dorchester, Park Lane
- Embassy Club, Old Bond Street
- Fischer's Restaurant, Bond Street
- Grosvenor House Hotel, Park Lane
- Hatchettes, Piccadilly
- Hollywood restaurant, Piccadilly
- Kit-Cat Club, Haymarket
- Monseigneur Grill restaurant, 16-17 Jermyn Street, SW1
- The May Fair, Berkeley Square
- Murray's Club, Beak Street
- New Princes, Piccadilly
- Piccadilly Hotel, Piccadilly
- Quaglino's, Bury Street
- Romano's, Strand
- Savoy Hotel, Strand
- The Waldorf Hilton, London, Aldwych

== In popular culture ==
- The 1935 British musical comedy film She Shall Have Music, featured Jack Hylton as himself in a speaking role, and his orchestra.
- The 1937 British musical comedy film Calling All Stars featured Bert Ambrose, Carroll Gibbons and Evelyn Dall.
- The 1938 British musical comedy film Kicking the Moon Around featured Bert Ambrose and Evelyn Dall.
- The BBC Radio programme Dance Band Days ran from 1969 to 1995 with a playlist of British dance band music. It was presented by Alan Dell, and subsequently by Malcolm Laycock. The programme was later transferred to Sunday Night at 10, until the British dance band content was dropped by the BBC in 2008.
- The BBC Radio programme Thanks For The Memory, presented by Hubert Gregg, regularly featured British dance band music, and ran for 35 years until his death in 2004.
- The English television dramatist Dennis Potter was responsible for repopularizing music from the British dance band era in several of his works, with his actors miming period songs in Pennies From Heaven (1978) and The Singing Detective (1986).

== See also ==
- List of British dance band leaders
