= Bert Firman =

English bandleader (1906–1999)

- Born: Herbert Feuerman; 3 February 1906; London, England
- Died: 9 April 1999 (aged 93) England
- Genres: Easy listening, instrumental, jazz, big band
- Occupations: Bandleader, composer
- Instrument: Violin
- Label: Zonophone Records

Bert Firman (born Herbert Feuerman; 3 February 1906 – 9 April 1999) was an English bandleader of the 1920s, 1930s and 1940s.

He was born in London. His mother was of Polish stock and his father was a professional musician who had settled in Britain from Austria-Hungary in the late 1880s. His three elder brothers were also musicians. He took up the violin at an early age and won a scholarship to the Guildhall School of Music.

Firman's first job, at the age of thirteen, was at the Playhouse Theatre, London, where he was part of a quintet playing entr'acte music. A year later his father negotiated a position for him in the orchestra at the Victoria Hotel in Northumberland Avenue. After only three months in this job he secured the part of Sascha, a gypsy violinist in the musical Sally at the Winter Garden Theatre, Drury Lane. The production opened on 10 September 1921, running for 383 performances. During this run, at the suggestion of the producer, George Grossmith Jr., Feuerman changed his name to Bert Firman, apparently so as to make it easier to bill in lights outside the theatre. When the run of Sally finished, Firman got a job as a violinist with the Midnight Follies Orchestra at the Metropole Hotel. Shortly after beginning this job, the current bandleader was indisposed, and Firman was offered the job. He was then only sixteen, and he would thereafter claim to have been the youngest bandleader in the world.

In 1924, Firman became musical director for Zonophone Records (a subsidiary of His Master's Voice) and in the following five years recorded over 750 sides for them. Throughout the 1920s Firman continued to lead his band from success to success, including a season in variety at the Alhambra Theatre, Leicester Square and the Coliseum Theatre, whilst still also directing the Midnight Follies and then later, bands at the Devonshire Restaurant and the Carlton Hotel. As well as recording with his band, Firman also produced many recordings with a smaller group called The Rhythmic Eight. The group included such prominent musicians as Sylvester Ahola, Chelsea Quealey, Frank Guarente, Arthur Lally, Danny Polo, Max Goldberg and Jack Jackson.

In 1929, Firman was given a six-month contract to be a guest conductor at N.B.C., becoming the first British bandleader to broadcast in America. He then spent some time in Hollywood adding music to a large number of silent films.

Firman then formed a band in London, which he took to Les Ambassadeurs restaurant in Paris. The band included Sam Costa, a young pianist who would later become a singer and actor, as well as Freddy Gardner, a talented British saxophonist. He spent several years in France before returning to London in 1937 to form another band. During this period he broadcast regularly for the BBC, and had several series on Radio Luxembourg.

At the outbreak of war Firman moved to the Café de Paris with a band that included Ivor Mairants and George Melachrino. However, after a dispute with the management he walked out. He then joined up with the South Staffordshire Regiment. After completing his training, he went to Egypt, Syria, Palestine and Persia, with Stars in Battledress, an organization dedicated to entertaining the troops. Later, the party moved to Europe and crossed the Rhine with the British troops.

After the war, Firman was set to lead a band in London again, but was annoyed at being asked to audition for the BBC. He therefore went to lead a band in Paris again, where he formed a band at the Bagatelle Club. The band, which included Stephane Grappelli and Django Reinhardt, was to be his last.

Firman finally retired from band leading, partly because the age of the big bands was coming to an end. He withdrew entirely from the music business, working on the London Metal Exchange until he opted for full retirement in 1976. He died on 9 April 1999, aged 93.
