= Arthur Schutt =

American jazz musician

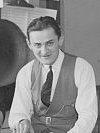
Schutt in the 1920s

"Bluin' the Black Keys"

Arthur Schutt (November 21, 1902 – January 28, 1965) was an American jazz pianist and arranger.

Schutt was born in Reading, Pennsylvania, United States, and learned piano from his father. He accompanied silent films as a teenager in the 1910s and was playing in a movie palace in 1918 when Paul Specht hired him to play in a band; he worked for Specht until 1924, including during a tour of Europe in 1923. He held positions with Roger Wolfe Kahn and Don Voorhees, and became a prolific studio pianist, recording with Fred Rich, Nat Shilkret, Frankie Trumbauer, Bix Beiderbecke, and the Charleston Chasers. From 1926 to 1929 and again in 1931 he played with Red Nichols; he also recorded with Jimmy and Tommy Dorsey's orchestra (1928–31), and Benny Goodman. He recorded under his own name in 1929–30 as a bandleader.

Schutt receded from jazz in the 1930s, though he did play with Bud Freeman in 1939. He spent much of the 1940s and 1950s working in the Hollywood recording studios.

Schutt composed a jazz tune "Delirium" in 1927, which was widely recorded. In 1934, Schutt co-wrote "Georgia Jubilee" with Benny Goodman which, while a hit, was also recorded by Isham Jones's band. Schutt also composed the piano Novelty piece "Bluin' the Black Keys", considered one of the most difficult compositions within the piano Novelty genre ever written.

Schutt died in San Francisco, California, in January 1965, at the age of 62.

== See also ==
- List of ragtime composers
