= Carroll Gibbons =

American pianist, bandleader and composer (1903–1954)

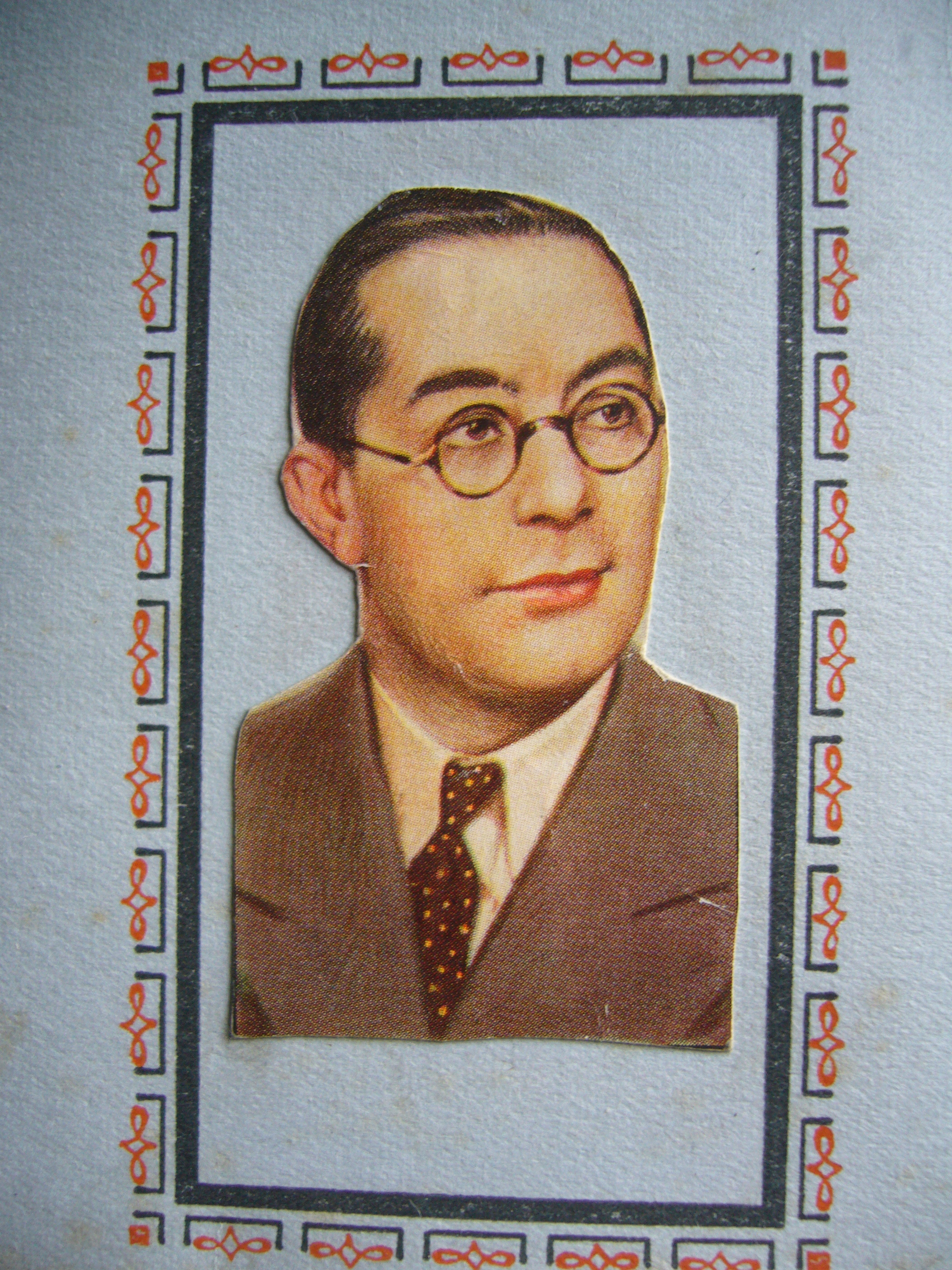
- Image of Gibbons from the W.D. & H.O. Wills Radio Celebrities cigarette card series

Background information
- Born: Charles Richard Gibbons; January 4, 1903; Clinton, Massachusetts, United States
- Died: May 10, 1954 (aged 51) London, England
- Genres: Jazz
- Occupations: Pianist, bandleader, composer
- Instrument: Piano
- Years active: 1920s–1954

Carroll Richard Gibbons (born Charles Richard Gibbons; January 4, 1903 – May 10, 1954) was an American-born pianist, bandleader and popular composer who made his career primarily in England during the British dance band era.

== Early life and career ==
Charles Richard Gibbons was born and raised in Clinton, Massachusetts, United States, one of three children of Peter and Mary Gibbons. In his late teens he travelled to London to study at the Royal Academy of Music. In 1924, he returned to London as a relief pianist with the Boston Orchestra for an engagement at the Savoy Hotel in the Strand.

He liked Britain so much that he settled there, and after becoming pianist with the Sylvians, featuring members of the Savoy Orpheans, he later became the co-leader (with Howie Jacobs) of the Orpheans, the resident band at the Savoy Hotel until their contract ended in 1927, when they embarked on a tour of Germany. On his return, he became Director of Light Music at His Master's Voice, and the bandleader of the New MayFair Orchestra, which recorded for the Gramophone Company on the His Master's Voice label.

In 1929, Gibbons appeared in the British film Splinters as "Carroll Gibbons and His Master's Voice Orchestra". Ray Noble led the New Mayfair [sic] Orchestra starting in 1929.

== The 1930s ==
Gibbons made occasional return trips to the United States but settled permanently in England, though he did spend a couple of years (1930–1931) in Hollywood, where he worked as a staff composer for MGM films. He took joint leadership of the Savoy Hotel Orpheans in 1931 along with Howard Jacobs, taking sole leadership in June 1932. The group recorded hundreds of popular songs (many of which were sung by Anne Lenner) between June 1932 and his death in 1954, all featuring Gibbons on piano. Starting in about 1931, he also recorded many sophisticated records featuring a piano-led small group playing pop tunes and medleys under the name of Carroll Gibbons and his Boy Friends, of which some contained tracks by singer Hildegarde.

As a composer, Gibbons's most popular songs included "A Garden in the Rain" (1928, his Savoy signature) and "On the Air" (1932). The latter was covered by Rudy Vallée in 1933 and by Lud Gluskin in 1936. Gibbons' instrumental numbers "Bubbling Over" and "Moonbeam Dance" were also quite successful in the United Kingdom. Gibbons and his orchestra had a weekly show on Radio Luxembourg in the 1930s, sponsored by Hartley's Jam.

== Marriage and death ==
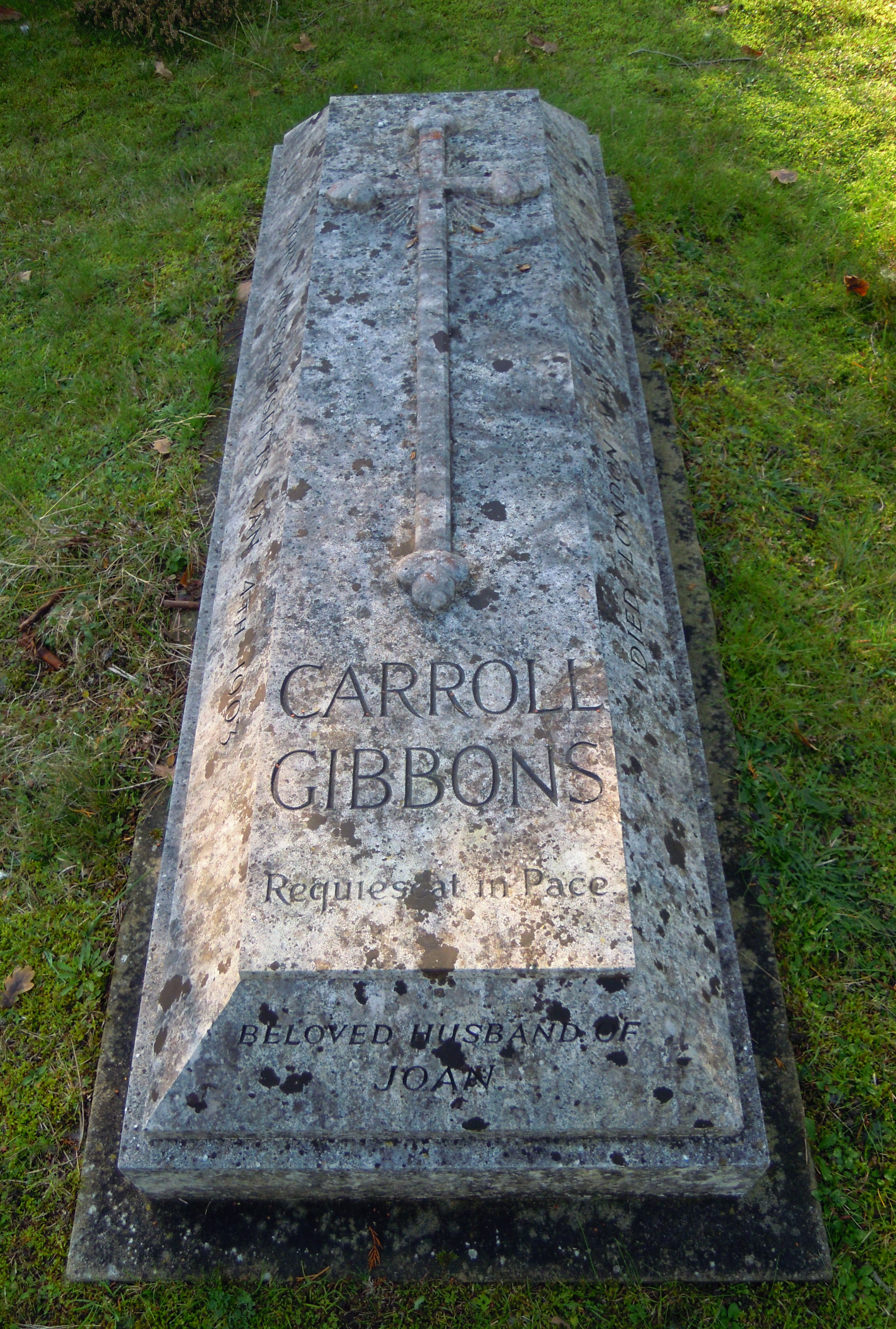
Gibbons' grave in Brookwood Cemetery

Gibbons continued as bandleader at the Savoy until 1950 when he became the hotel's Director of Entertainments. Ian Stewart then took over as the Savoy's bandleader and music director. He married Joan Muriel (née Lidstone) in 1951. He died at the London Clinic in May 1954 at the age of 51, of a coronary thrombosis. He is one of several famous musicians buried in Brookwood Cemetery in Surrey, England.

== Legacy ==
Specialist dance band radio stations, such as Swing Street Radio and Radio Dismuke, continue to play his records. Gibbons also features regularly on the bi-weekly Manx Radio programme Sweet & Swing, presented by Howard Caine. The UK 1940s Radio Station, a dedicated Internet radio station, also regularly plays Gibbons's records.

== Selected filmography ==
- Looking on the Bright Side (1932)
- Call Me Mame (1933)
- Romance in Rhythm (1934)
- Falling in Love (1935)
- Hello, Sweetheart (1935)
- Calling All Stars (1937)
- The Common Touch (1941) - accompanies Greta Gynt on piano and vocals
- I Live in Grosvenor Square (1945)
