= My Woman (1932 song) =

1932 song

Single by Lew Stone & his Monseigneur Band (with vocal refrain by Al Bowlly)
- A-side: "Junk Man Blues"
- Published: 11 March 1932
- Released: 1933
- Recorded: Chelsea, London, 29 November 1932
- Genre: British dance band, traditional pop
- Length: 3:18
- Label: Decca Records
- Composers: Max Wartell, Irving Wallman
- Lyricist: Harry Crosby

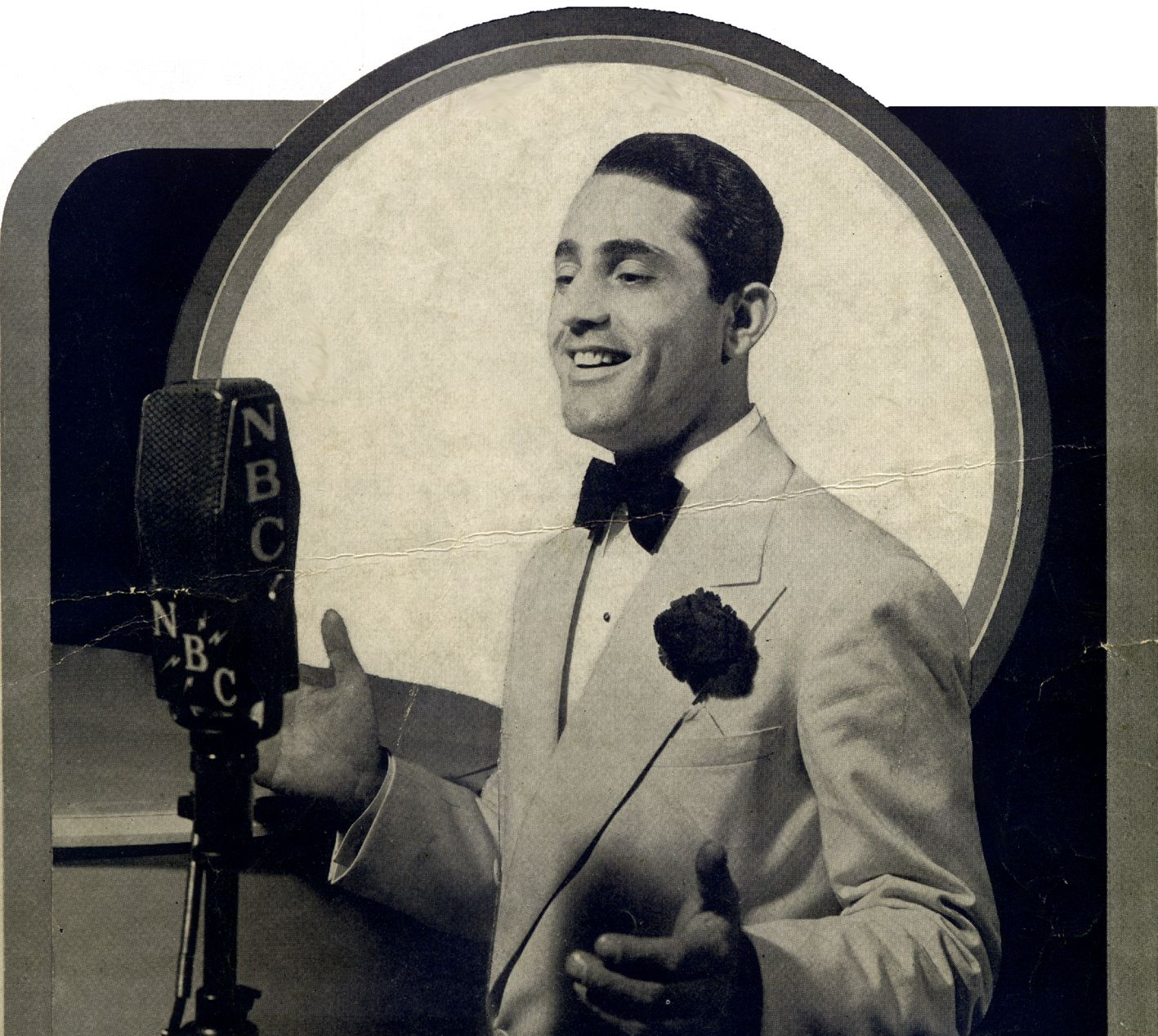
Al Bowlly

"My Woman" is a song with lyrics by Bing Crosby and music by Max Wartell and Irving Wallman, recorded by Crosby on 23 February 1932, in New York City for Brunswick Records. He was backed by the Brunswick Studio Orchestra directed by Victor Young, with Tommy Dorsey on trombone and Larry Gomar on drums. The song was first published on 11 March 1932. The recording by Lew Stone & his Monseigneur Band (named for their residency at London's Monseigneur restaurant), with vocal refrain by Al Bowlly, has since become well-known through its use in samples on latter-day pop recordings.

== Lew Stone recording ==
Stone and his band recorded the song in Chelsea, London, on 29 November 1932, as the last of three songs at a Decca session, with vocals by Al Bowlly. It was arranged by Stone, with a trumpet solo by Nat Gonella. The other personnel in Stone's band were Alfie Noakes (trumpet), Joe Ferrie, Lew Davis (trombone), Joe Crossman, Jim Easton, Ernest Ritte (clarinet, alto saxophone, baritone saxophone), Harry Berly (clarinet, tenor saxophone, ocarina, viola), Eddie Carroll (piano), Bill Herbert (guitar), Tiny Winters (string bass) and Bill Harty (drums). "My Woman" was originally released in 1933 as the B-side to "Junk Man Blues", recorded at the same session. Stone's version (billed as a Fox-Trot on the label) was the only contemporary recording of the song by a British dance band.

== Later samples ==
The instrumental hook in the Stone recording has often been sampled for use in other songs.

It was prominently used in White Town's 1997 hit "Your Woman", which was a UK Singles Chart number 1 hit in 1997. The White Town song was subsequently covered by Tyler James, who had a hit with his version of "Your Woman" in 2005. It kept the Stone sample. Another 2009 version by Princess Chelsea also kept the sample.

In 2010, "Never Be Your Woman" by Naughty Boy presents Wiley featuring Emeli Sandé reached the top 10 in the UK. It again sampled the Stone recording, while also incorporating elements of the White Town song.

Kate Earl sampled the line for the song "All That Glitters" on her 2017 album Tongue Tied.

The song is sampled in the 2020 Dua Lipa single "Love Again".

The 2025 single "Paid in Full" by AJ Tracey featuring Big Zuu, Wax, Ets and D7 samples the song.
