= Love Again (Dua Lipa song) =

2021 single by Dua Lipa

Single by Dua Lipa

from the album Future Nostalgia
- Released: 11 March 2021
- Studio: TaP (London); Sleeper Sound (London); RAK (London); The Windmill (Norfolk); Modulator Music (Toronto)
- Genre: Dance-pop; disco; electropop
- Length: 4:18
- Label: Warner
- Songwriters: Dua Lipa; Clarence Coffee Jr.; Stephen Kozmeniuk; Chelcee Grimes; Bing Crosby; Max Wartell; Irving Wallman
- Producer: Koz

Dua Lipa singles chronology
"We're Good" (2021)	"Love Again" (2021)	"Demeanor" (2021)

Music video
- "Love Again" on YouTube

"Love Again" is a song by English singer Dua Lipa from her second studio album, Future Nostalgia (2020). The song was written by Lipa alongside Clarence Coffee Jr., Chelcee Grimes and its producer Koz. They wrote the song based on the concept of manifesting positive things into one's life and Lipa later described it as her favourite song on the album. It was sent for radio airplay in France on 11 March 2021 as the seventh and final single from Future Nostalgia before being released for digital download and streaming on 4 June globally. It is a classic-sounding dance-pop, disco and electropop song with a 21st-century nu-disco production that includes disco beats and 1970s-styled disco strings. The song samples "My Woman" by Al Bowlly with Lew Stone and His Monseigneur Band, using it for several aspects, thus Bing Crosby, Max Wartell and Irving Wallman are also credited as writers. The lyrics explore themes of heartbreak and personal growth, seeing Lipa falling in love again with a new lover following a rough split.

Several music critics praised the use of the "My Woman" sample as well as the strings used in the production and the lyrics. Commercially, "Love Again" reached number 51 on the UK Singles Chart and number 41 on the US Billboard Hot 100 as well as number 59 on the Billboard Global 200 chart. It additionally reached the top 10 of charts in Belgium, Bulgaria, Croatia, Hungary, Poland, Slovakia and the Czech Republic, reaching the summit in the last of the territories. The song has been certified gold in the United Kingdom by the British Phonographic Industry (BPI), platinum in Austria, Italy, Portugal and Spain and multi-platinum in France, Brazil, Poland and Canada.

The music video for "Love Again" was directed by Lope Serrano and filmed at the Grosvenor House Hotel in London. The visual sees Lipa and her rodeo clown-styled dancers in the hotel's ballroom line dancing, riding mechanical bulls that sometimes disappear and painting eggs. A horse appears and the rodeo clowns attempt to capture a giant egg. The hats featured prominently in the music video were made by milliner Gladys Tamez. Several critics commended the video's message of it being silly to fall in love so soon, as well as its Western style and surrealism. Lipa performed the song on multiple occasions in 2021, including at the Time 100 event, at the 41st Brit Awards as part of a Future Nostalgia Medley and at the iHeartRadio Music Festival. The song was included on the setlist of Lipa's 2022 Future Nostalgia Tour. It was further promoted with remixes by Horse Meat Disco, Imanbek and Garabatto.

== Writing and production ==
"Love Again" was written by Lipa and her longtime collaborators Clarence Coffee Jr., Chelcee Grimes and Stephen Kozmeniuk, the latter of whom also handled the production. They began working on the song while Lipa was going through a rough patch with a breakup. She had been in a relationship with someone who was dishonest to her and realised it was no longer healthy for her. During the relationship, Lipa failed to recognise herself and felt as though she had lost her power, as she usually sees herself as a strong woman. The collaborators had been working together in the studio for a couple days, but had not written anything they liked. Lipa was running late to the studio that day, while Kozmeniuk came in early determined to make something cool. With her album Future Nostalgia, Lipa wanted to create "old-styled" music with a modern twist, being inspired by artists that she grew up listening to. Having known that, Kozmeniuk played with some analog synths and came up with a rudimentary chord progression. He then added a guitar riff on top and a drum break throughout the song. Acoustic guitars were then added. When Lipa arrived at the studio, Grimes and Coffee were playing the guitar and singing "Hotdamn, you got me in love again". Lipa quickly rejected the line and changed it to "Goddamn, you got me in love again". She began expressing her feelings about the relationship to the writers, and Coffee suggested writing about that. They decided to begin the song with a concept of manifesting positive energy into one's life and realizing some things need to end. Lipa thought that if she wrote about this, she might feel better. They started writing "Love Again" on a guitar and the song was originally in a non-standard song structure, which Lipa was fine with. Lipa thought the version felt good.

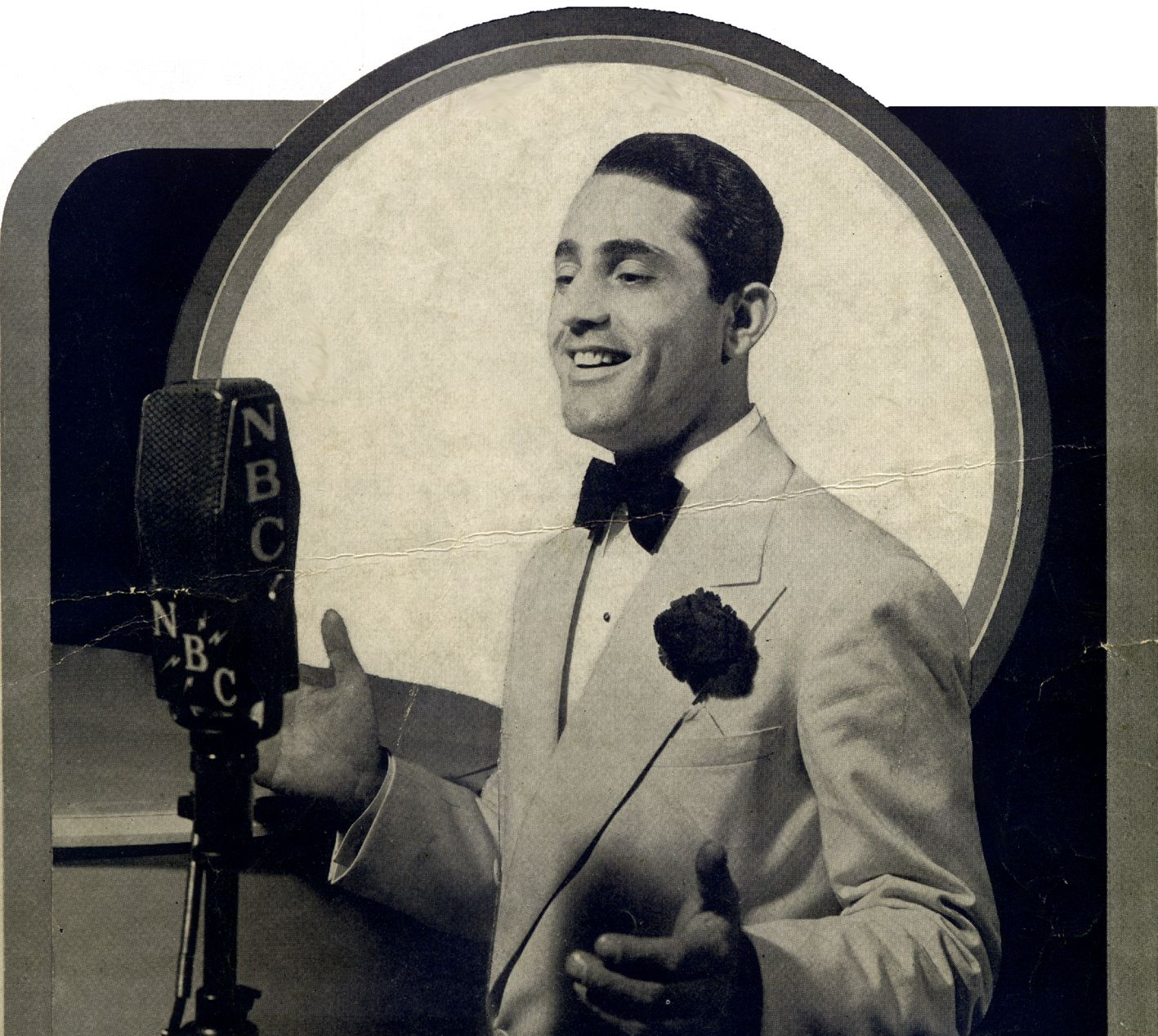
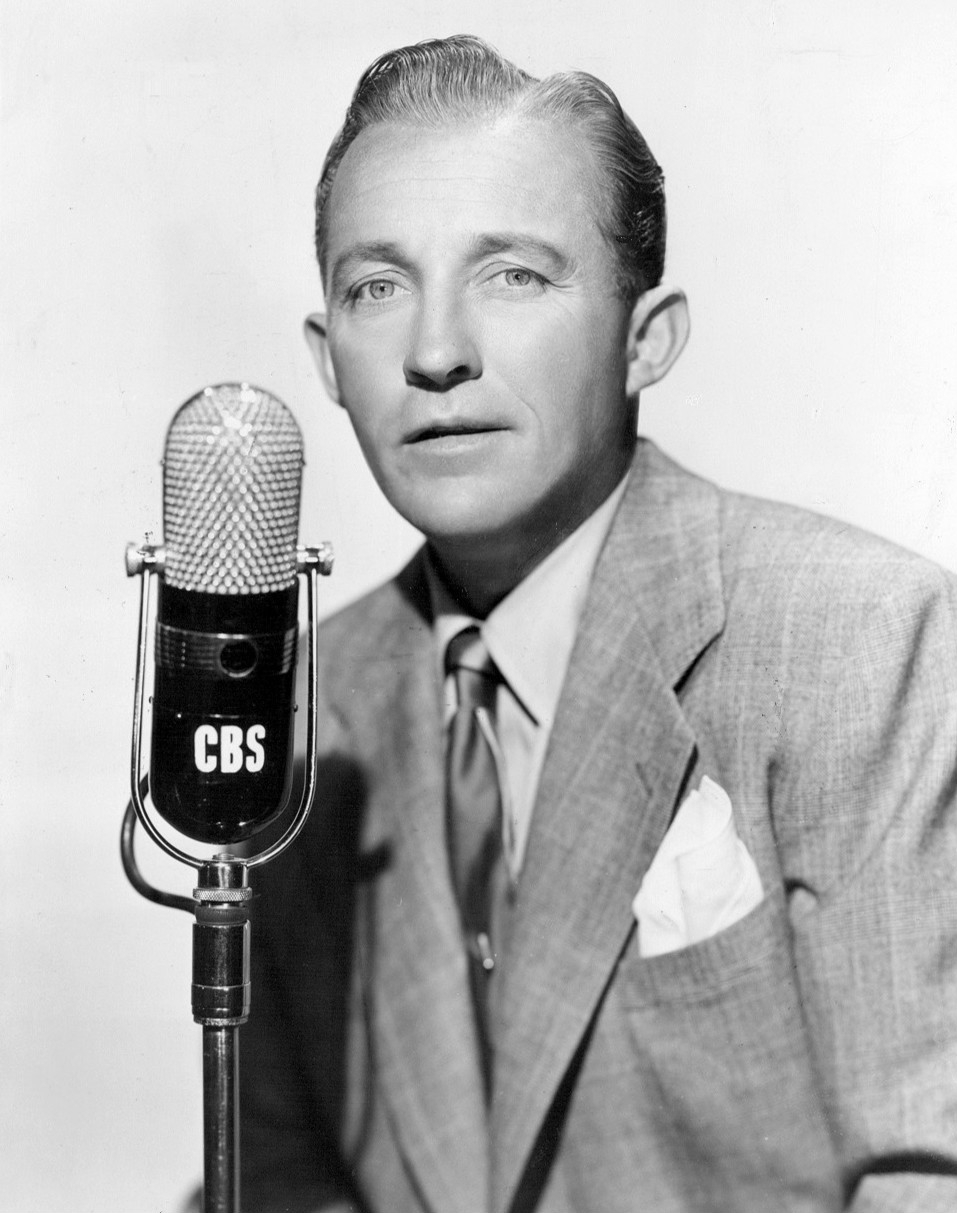
Clarence Coffee Jr. sang the riff of "My Woman" (1932) by Al Bowlly (pictured left) which resulted in a sample of the song included in "Love Again" and credit for its writers, including Bing Crosby (pictured right).

Following the session, Kozmeniuk was reading a Studio 54 book and he was picturing the work of Donna Summer where she had built up with a lot of a drums and string parts in an intro, before the song began. Inspired by this, he got his neighbour Drew Jurecka to play the violin and strings. Kozmeniuk quickly sent the string version to Lipa, which she admired for how dramatic it was. However, all the collaborators agreed that the song was still missing something. Later, two beats were added to the middle eight to build for a string part before exploding with the chorus. One night while they were all in a studio, Coffee began singing the riff of the 1990s hit track "Your Woman" by White Town over the top of what they had. Lipa thought the riff was from Star Wars (1977), while Grimes thought it was eerie and spooky. Lipa then suggested that they should incorporate it into "Love Again". Kozmeniuk spent a lot of time doing so with several different pitch corrections as "Love Again" and "My Woman" were in different keys. Due to this, Bing Crosby, Max Wartell and Irving Wallman were credited as writers. Coffee and Grimes questioned Lipa on including the line "I'll sink my teeth in disbelief" but Lipa fought really hard for it. She described the line as a visual one where you can almost taste how good something is, like the rush of adrenaline when she is about to get on stage. The singer later described this as her favourite line she has ever written. The line was originally "don't wake me up if it's a dream".

Lipa's vocals were recorded at RAK Studios in London. She went to the studio with her vocal producer Lorna Blackwood. Blackwood told Lipa to sing the sad parts of the song with a smile. Lipa recorded the ad-libs last, nervously thinking she would go off pitch. However, the nerves went away as the booth is like a school bathroom with strong acoustics where anything sounds great. Other vocals were recorded at TaP Studio and Sleeper Sound, both in London. The song was recorded at the latter of the two studios as well as Windmill in Norfolk and Modulator Music in Toronto. Mixing was handled by Matty Green at Studio 55 in Los Angeles while Chris Gehringer mastered the song at Sterling Sound in Edgewater, New Jersey. Lipa described "Love Again" as "dance crying" as it is a dance song with the juxtaposition of both happy and sad feelings. As the song was written in parts instead of a complete track, there were several different versions of it. At one point Lipa suggested making the current middle eight the chorus, but quickly went with the demo version. After the song was finished, the collaborators spent a lot of time getting the structure right and playing with the arrangements, right up until the final mix. Lipa described "Love Again" as her favourite song on Future Nostalgia.

== Music and lyrics ==
"Love Again"
A dance-pop, disco and electropop song set to a 21st-century nu-disco production, "Love Again" uses 1970s-styled strings and disco beats. Lipa uses husky vocals and sings about unexpectedly falling in love after a messy split with a former lover.

Musically, "Love Again" is a dance-pop, disco and electropop song with a classic sound and an electro-swing sample. The song has a length of 4:18, and a structure of verse, bridge, chorus, verse, bridge, chorus, bridge, middle eight, bridge, chorus. It is composed in the time signature of 4/4 time and the key of F♯ minor, with a tempo of 116 beats per minute and a chord progression of F♯m–D–Bm7–E. The song's melodramatic 21st-century nu-disco production matches its lyrics, and includes gloopy violins, orchestral sounds as well as disco beats and synths. Swooning, stirring and buzzing 1970s disco strings are also included, which add an emotional edge to the lyrics. The song samples "My Woman" (1932) by Al Bowlly with Lew Stone and His Monseigneur Band. These elements are featured in the intro and woven in and out throughout the song. This sample includes its strings, horn and trumpet, the latter of which was made popular by its sample in White Town's 1997 song "Your Woman". Acoustic guitar strums are included in the echoing bridge, before a repetitive hook and a thudding beat drop.

Lipa uses her lower register husky vocals that encapsulate an undeniable sense of urgency, as if she is mimicking the rush of falling in love with hints of tension ever so often. Her vocals range from the low note of E_{3} to the high note of A_{4}. Lyrically, "Love Again" explores themes of heartbreak and personal growth with proclamations of rediscovered love and the hateful romantic rediscovering of the power of love. Lipa expresses her powerlessness in a new relationship and explains how terrifying it can be. Having fallen out with the belief in love, she navigates her feelings after being unexpectedly swept off her feet by a new partner following a rough split with a previous lover. She knows how a new love could end, but is faithful and open to what the future might bring. Lipa additionally described it as one manifesting good things into their life when things are not going their way.

== Release and promotion ==
"Love Again" was released through Warner Records on 27 March 2020 as the eighth track on Lipa's second studio album Future Nostalgia. A lyric video for it was released on 9 April 2020. A remix of the song by Horse Meat Disco is a part of Lipa and the Blessed Madonna's 28 August 2020-released, DJ Mix-crafted remix album Club Future Nostalgia, while the original version of the remix was released for digital download and streaming on 11 September 2020. It is a 1980s-styled, percussion and synth-heavy remix that introduces simple melodies, funk-laced instrumentals and strutting beats with a retro charm; although, the "My Woman" sample is no longer heard. The song was the subject of a 15 December 2020-released Song Exploder volume 2 episode on Netflix in which Lipa and her collaborators talk about the making of the song.

"Love Again" was promoted to radios in France on 11 March 2021 as the seventh single from Future Nostalgia. The song was released for digital download and streaming globally on 4 June. Nina Braca of Billboard noted that this release, after 15 months following the release of the album, was "practically unheard of" in modern music era as "album cycles often come and go in as little as a few weeks". The song was sent for radio airplay in Italy on 11 June 2021. On 22 June 2021, it was promoted to contemporary hit, adult contemporary and dance radio stations in the United States as a promotional single. The song was officially sent as a single to contemporary hit radio stations in the country on 6 July and adult contemporary radio stations on 26 July 2021. It was promoted with two more remixes: the 1 October 2021-released Imanbek remix and the 15 October-released Garabatto remix.

== Reception ==
Elly Watson of DIY praised the use of the "My Woman" sample as "goosebump-inducing," while MusicOMH's Nick Smith stated it has a "slapping effect." Smith went on to call the song a "highlight" and compared it to Madonna's Confessions on a Dance Floor (2005). The Independent's Helen Brown thought that the song has Lipa's best use of a sample with "My Woman". She also questioned if it is Lipa's "most romantic song" to date, while David Levesley's GQ review saw him calling the song her "most powerfully pro-love song to date". Jonathan Wright of God Is in the TV commended the "excellent" use of the "My Woman" sample, as well as complimenting the string arrangement and middle eight. Evan Sawdey of PopMatters commended the "clever" use of the "My Woman" sample, stating it makes the song "stand out." In a separate, negative review from the same publication, Nick Malone stated that the hook doesn't "pop" the way it needs to, Lipa's vocals are "non-committal" and the "My Woman" sample does not make it "soar".

Writing for Stereogum, Chris DeVille found the song to be reminiscent of Vicki Sue Robinson's "Turn the Beat Around" (1976), while Jeffrey Davies' review for Spectrum Culture saw him compare it to "I Feel Love" (1977) by Donna Summer. Nylon writer Steffanee Wang viewed the song as a "Western movie's take on the feverish emotion" of love. In her review for The Guardian, Laura Snapes complimented Lipa for being awestruck in the song. Mike Nied of Idolator commended Lipa's "dulcet" vocals, stating they work well for this song. He continued by noting its contrast to her single "Don't Start Now" (2019) as well as viewing "Love Again" as a vulnerable moment. For Business Insider, Callie Ahlgrim thought that Lipa's vocals "shine" on the track, while also calling it "cinematic."

Slant Magazine ranked "Love Again" as 2020's 25th best song and writer Sal Cinquemani praised it for demonstrating "Lipa's knack for wringing pathos from everyday dating woes and pouring it into sublime dance-pop." He additionally viewed the song as "euphoric" and a "dizzying dance-floor filler." For Crack, Michael Cragg thought that the song is a "sky-scraping ballad" that transforms into a "sophisticated, dancefloor-ready bop". From her review in Billboard, Bianca Gracie saw that the use of strings adds a "jolt of nostalgia", while the lyrics see Lipa in an "out-of-body love experience". Overall, she named it Future Nostalgia's sixth best track and one of the album's sultrier moments. In April 2020, Christopher Rosa of Glamour ranked it as Lipa's sixth best song, viewing it as the album's most "overtly disco" track and "grandiose ode to falling in love against your better wishes".

== Commercial performance ==
Upon Future Nostalgia's release, "Love Again" became a relatively successful album track across Europe. The song reached number 38 in Lithuania, 107 in Portugal, 86 in Romania, 62 in Slovakia and 90 in Spain. It additionally entered at number 61 on both the UK Singles Downloads Chart and UK Audio Streaming Chart. In April 2020, the Official Charts Company reported that the song was the most downloaded album track from the album in the United Kingdom. Following its release as a single, "Love Again" debuted at number 159 on the Billboard Global 200 chart dated 19 June 2021. In October of that year, the song spent its 20th week on the chart, reaching a peak position of number 59. The song spent a total of 35 weeks on the Global 200. On France's SNEP Singles Chart, the song debuted at number 198 on the issue dated 10 April 2021, before peaking at number 41 two months later and charting for 37 weeks. The song reached the top five on French Airplay, becoming her fifth top five in the country.

In the UK, "Love Again" debuted at number 96 on the UK Singles Chart dated 18 June 2021. It departed the chart the following week but re-entered at number 92 on the chart dated 23 July 2021. Four weeks later, the song peaked at number 51 on the UK Singles Chart, lasting for a total of nine weeks. In October 2021, it was awarded a silver certification from the British Phonographic Industry (BPI) for selling 200,000 track-equivalent units in the United Kingdom. In Ireland, the song debuted at number 87 on the Irish Singles Chart dated 11 June 2021. Two months later, the song peaked at number 36 and spent a total of 23 weeks on the chart. In the Wallonia region of Belgium, the song debuted at number 34 in May 2021, before peaking at the runner-up position three months later. It was blocked from the summit by Ed Sheeran's "Bad Habits" (2021) and spent 27 weeks on the chart. In the country's Flanders region, the song also charted for 27 weeks, debuting at number 46 in June 2021 and peaking at number five the following month.

In Germany, "Love Again" charted for 18 weeks and peaked at number 44. Elsewhere in Europe, the song reached the top 10 of charts in Bulgaria, Croatia, Hungary, Poland and Slovakia while reaching the summit in the Czech Republic. In 2022, the song was certified platinum by the Federazione Industria Musicale Italiana (FIMI) for selling 70,000 track-equivalent units in Italy. In 2023 was awarded a triple platinum certification in Poland by the Polish Society of the Phonographic Industry (ZPAV) for 150,000 track-equivalent unit sales. On the Canadian Hot 100, "Love Again" debuted at number 75 on the chart dated 17 July 2021. It spent 22 weeks on the chart, peaking at number 11 in the 14th week. It was awarded a triple platinum certification in the country from Music Canada for selling 240,000 track-equivalent units in the country. In the US, the song spent two weeks on the Bubbling Under Hot 100 chart before entering the Billboard Hot 100 at number 89 in July 2021. In October 2021, it peaked at number 41 and spent 16 weeks charting. The song additionally peaked at number 60 on Australia's ARIA Singles Chart and number 3 on the NZ Hot Singles Chart.

== Music video ==
=== Background and release ===
The music video for "Love Again" was directed by Lope Serrano of Spanish production team Canada. Lipa contacted the production company for another collaboration following the video for her 2020 single "Physical". They were briefed with information that Lipa pictured herself on a mechanical bull for the video, it was her favourite song on the album and that the song was about a personal resurgence, not necessarily just in a romantic context. When writing the video, Serrano attempted to gather real and predictable rodeo elements and combine them in unexpected ways. The production team found new meanings of the rodeo elements to communicate in the video, including using the clown makeup for abstract painting strains so classical paintings could be used to connect shots. They used paintings that depicted horses, romantic raptures, hugs, portraits and hyperdynamic group compositions. Serrano decided to add egg aspects to the video as he was looking for "an unexpected rhyme to the lasso routine". He thought that the wrist movement when one beats eggs is similar to a lasso movement. He also wanted to illustrate the song's romantic message, like the idea of a love coming up again that seems like a once in a lifetime experience that is pure, intense and unexpected, which he compared to "like these delicate flowers or animals that are just designed to blossom and intercourse just once and then they die" as well as the "tense connection between the humans and their recovered feelings".

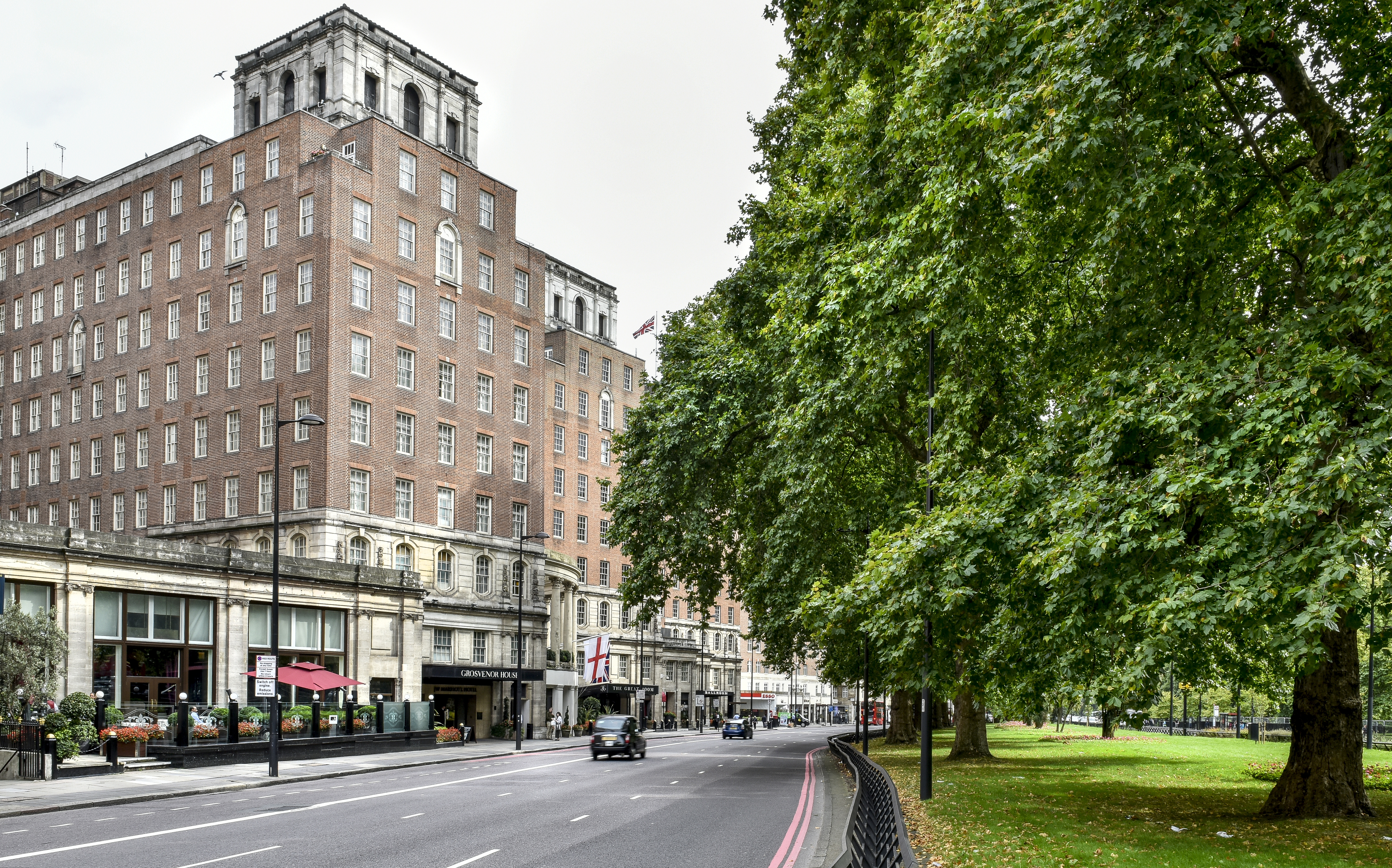
The music video for "Love Again" was filmed at the Grosvenor House Hotel in London.

The visual was filmed at the Grosvenor House Hotel in London about three weeks before its release, during rehearsals for Lipa's performance at the 41st Brit Awards. Serrano liked the idea of shooting in one place as it adds to the video's cohesiveness and makes it as though the characters are real and belong to the setting. The video's team quarantined in the hotel for a week before they began filming due to restrictions associated with the COVID-19 pandemic. This gave the team time to work in the location. Lipa learned the video's choreography in 45 minutes and new outfits were added for her in the midst of filming. Serrano recalled she enjoyed being on the mechanical bull that was controlled. Steve Dent helped the team with the horse and production company Eighty4 helped with the VFX, making it so that when the horse went invisible, there was still a 3D aspect with the saddle and rider. These shots were the hardest to shoot so the team worked with the tension of the ropes attached to the horse's neck as well as adjusting its natural shadow.

Lipa formally announced the video on 31 May 2021. It premiered via YouTube on 4 June 2021. A director's cut version of the video was released on 28 July 2021. This version opens with two rodeo clowns reading a script, which is the lyrics of "Love Again", more classical paintings in the editing, less dancing, more shots of the clowns, a chicken on the TV set, Lipa riding the lighting horse as well as final credits that feature a rodeo clown riding the horse which has a green suit on.

=== Analysis and synopsis ===
The video opens with two title cards saying Lipa's name and the song title, "Love Again". Simultaneously, a Stetson cowboy hat floats from a coat room to a ballroom where Lipa catches it and puts it on her head. She wears a zebra print bikini top, belted black denim shorts, a suede vest, a cowboy hat, a bolo tie and chunky heeled boots while riding a mechanical bull; this bull later becomes invisible as a way to make things less emphatic and literal. Intercut scenes of Lipa riding the bull covered in miniature light bulbs and wearing a Phipps cowboy suit containing a green top, blue pants and a cowboy hat, also covered in miniature light bulbs, are also included, as well as her floating in slow motion while wearing Blumarine pink bandana crop top with a lacy trim, a lavender hat, a butterfly belt buckle with diamantés, blue denim pants and pink cowboy boots. She later waves a glowing lasso in the former scene. The singer is also seen cracking eggs with different coloured yolks to later whisk them in the same bowl while rodeo clowns crack them too and paint clown faces on each other with the coloured yolks as well as making omelettes. She wears a red-and-black denim set from a collaboration between Levi and Miu Miu with a leather jacket from the latter company's 2011 line.

Back in the ballroom, Lipa square dances and line dances with rodeo clowns as the floor is covered in eggs. She wears Rick Owens grill kiss leather boots, camouflage green cargo pants, a longline brown cow print jacket and a cow-print bra; the latter three clothing items are from The Attico. Some of the rodeo clowns also appear on invisible horses. Further on, a giant egg floats in the middle of the ballroom and the rodeo clowns attempt to capture it with lassos. The egg is eventually too much for them as it pulls them onto the floor before also becoming invisible. A horse covered in LEDs then runs in around the hallways. The "wild" horse scene is a metaphor for the idea of love, not being completely clear, while the egg scene adds to the metaphor by enhancing the people in the relationship with the cowboys, ropes and horse. Also, the floating egg being captured, tensioning its delicacy, is a metaphor for the myth of female reproduction and how weak male human violence can be. The video closes with Lipa dressed as a rodeo clown, slow dancing with an anonymous person; they both wear all white. Lipa wears a red nose and wipes some of her lipstick of the same colour onto her partner's jacket.

=== Reception ===
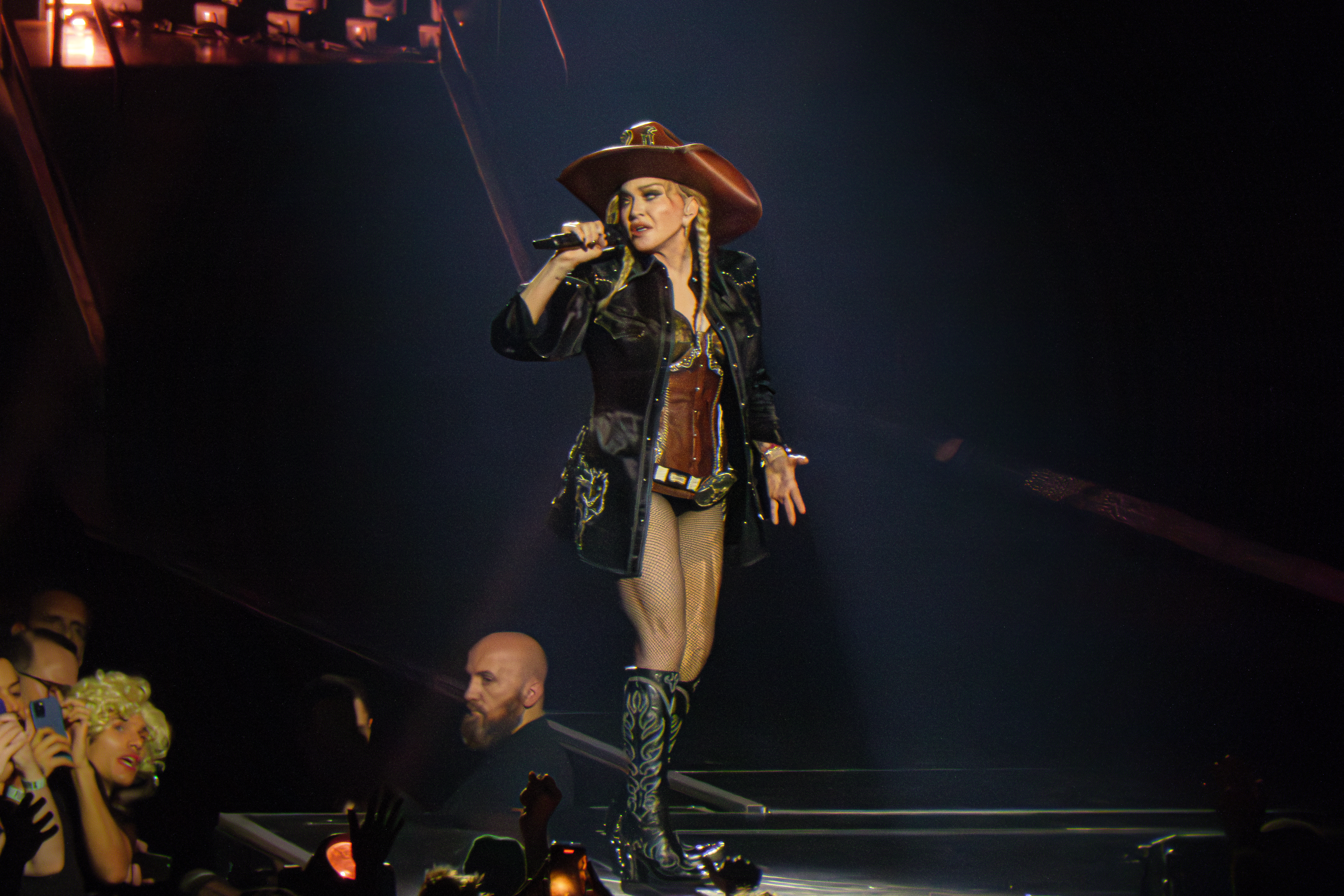
The music video for "Love Again" received comparisons to Madonna's (pictured in 2023) "Don't Tell Me" (2000).

Maia Kedem of Audacy hypothesised that Lipa wearing the clown makeup at the end may be a metaphor for "the clownery of falling back in love after experiencing heartbreak", while calling the metaphor "deep". Hot Press's Ciaran Brennan viewed Lipa's style in the video as "cowboy chic". In Refinery29, Eliza Huber said that although Western tropes in fashion have been popular for a while, Lipa makes the style "feel surprisingly fresh" in the video, while also comparing it to the clip for Madonna's "Don't Tell Me" (2000). Wang compared the hotel ballroom setting to The Shining (1980) while theorizing that the video documents the cast's "slow descent into insanity", "putting on clown makeup to also hoedown in the building's empty ballroom". For Grazia, Marisa Petrarca called the video "absolute gold" with Lipa embracing a "glamorous take on Western fashion" containing "epic" ensembles. Business Insider used the video as an example on how Stetson cowboy hats have changed demography in their "So Expensive" web series.

For Vulture, Devon Ivie labeled the music video a "surrealist country-inspired video" that "has us falling in love with [Lipa] all over again". The staff of Wonderland said their minds "are totally blown" with the video, while calling the fashion "gorgeous" and the choreography "a TikTok worthy dance routine". In The A.V. Club, Gabrielle Sanchez noted science fiction elements in the video with the invisible mechanical bull. Similarly, Erica Gonzales of Harper's Bazaar thought these elements are more "surreal", while also stating that the clown makeup is the best part of the video and thought that it poked fun at the "clownery" of falling in love knowing it could end badly. In a review from Billboard, Gil Kaufman said that Lipa gets her "urban cowgal on" in the visual and thought she took a "sensual, slow-mo ride" on the mechanical bull.

Cinquemani thought that the main takeaway from the video was "keep falling for the wrong person and the yolk's on you" while noting its use of special effects and praising the surreality. He went on to note that Lipa's "disco-cowgirl getup and choreography" was similar to that of "Don't Tell Me" and Halsey's "You Should Be Sad" (2020). The staff of Contactmusic.com said that Lipa looks like a "super-sexy Jessie Cowgirl" and praised her "natural born" bull-riding skills. They also said that the video gives the song "a whole new lease of life". For Consequence, Wren Graves named the video a "campy rodeo fantasy", while commending how Lipa waves her lasso, similarly to Wonder Woman. Josiah Hughes of Exclaim! stated that with the video, Lipa proves that "country and western dressup is a trend that will simply not die". "Love Again" won Best Pop Video at the 2021 UK Music Video Awards.

== Live performances ==
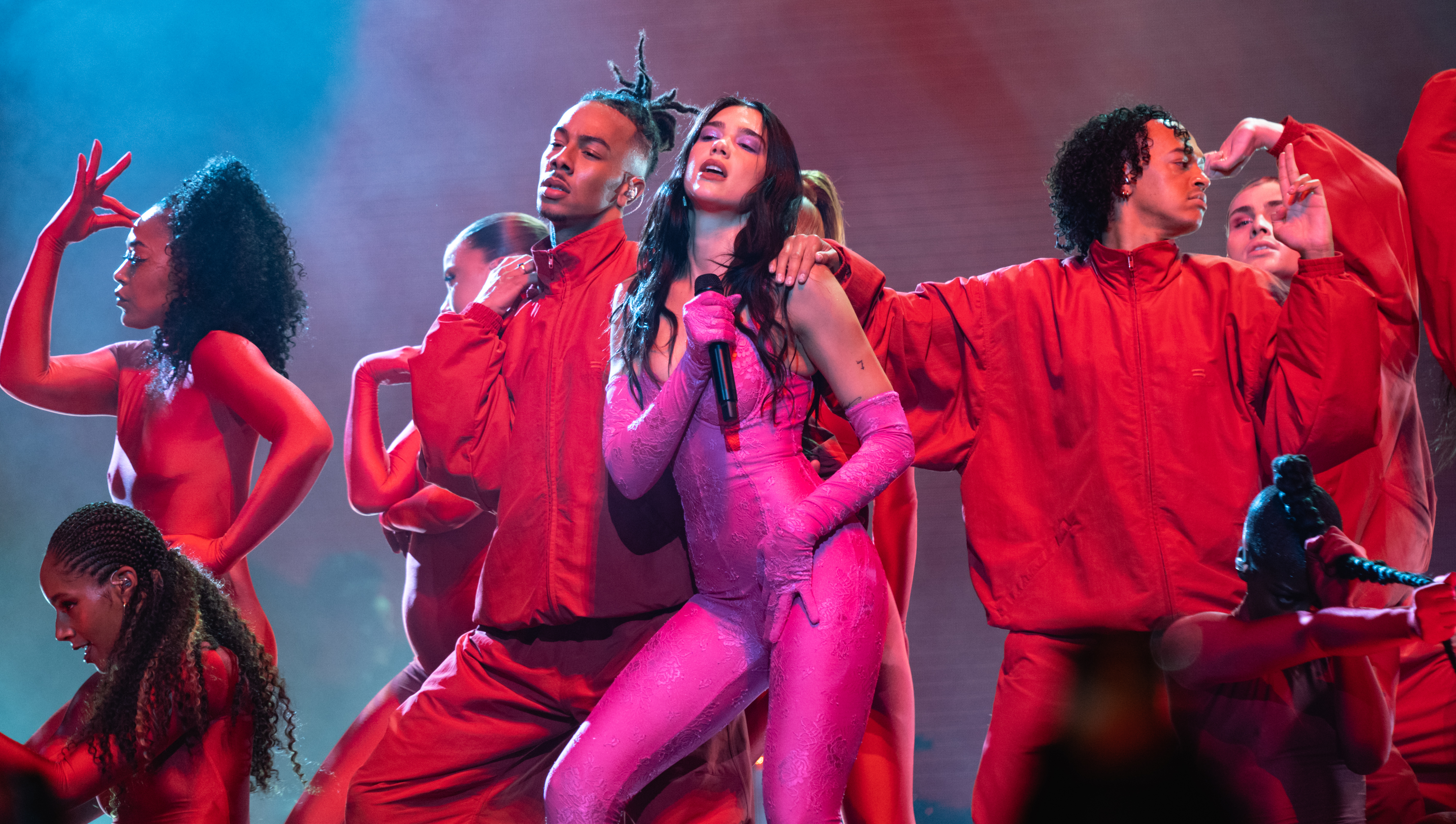
Lipa performing "Love Again" on the Future Nostalgia Tour in 2022

Lipa performed "Love Again" during her NPR Tiny Desk Concert, released 4 December 2020. Lipa described the performance as a "special" rendition of the song and the concert was filmed in London instead of Washington, D.C., where the concerts normally take place due to the COVID-19 pandemic. She was accompanied by backup singers, a bassist, a guitarist and a drum machine. On 19 February 2021, the singer performed a stripped-down acoustic version of the track during the 2021 Time 100 event along with her 2020 single "Levitating". Lipa performed the soft piano rendition of the song as a duet with Elton John at his AIDS Foundation Academy Award Party on 25 April 2021. She performed the song at the 41st Brit Awards as part of her set list of a Future Nostalgia Medley on 11 May 2021. The singer performed it at the 2021 iHeartRadio Music Festival on 17 September. The song was included on the setlist of Lipa's 2022 Future Nostalgia Tour.

== Track listings ==
- Digital download and streaming – Horse Meat Disco remix
1. "Love Again" (Horse Meat Disco remix) – 5:31
- Radio airplay – French radio edit
1. "Love Again" – 2:35
- Digital download and streaming
1. "Love Again" – 4:18
- Contemporary hit and adult contemporary radio – radio edit
1. "Love Again" – 3:53
- Digital download and streaming – Imanbek remix
1. "Love Again" (Imanbek remix) – 3:34
- Streaming – Imanbek remix – Spotify single
1. "Love Again" (Imanbek remix) – 3:34
2. "Love Again" – 4:18
- Digital download and streaming – Garabatto remix
1. "Love Again" (Garabatto remix) – 3:29
- Streaming – Garabatto remix – Spotify single
1. "Love Again" (Garabatto remix) – 3:29
2. "Love Again" (Imanbek remix) – 3:34
3. "Love Again" – 4:18

== Personnel ==
- Dua Lipa – vocals
- Koz – production, bass, drums, guitar, synthesizer
- Stuart Price – additional production, bass guitar, keyboards
- Clarence Coffee Jr. – backing vocals
- Alma Goodman – backing vocals
- Vanessa Luciano – backing vocals
- Chelcee Grimes – backing vocals (Note: In the liner notes of Future Nostalgia: The Moonlight Edition, only Clarence Coffee Jr., Alma Goodman and Vanessa Luciano are credited as backing vocalists on "Love Again". However, Lipa mentioned in the Song Exploder episode on the song that she can hear Chelcee Grimes' backing vocals in it.)
- Drew Jurecka – baritone violin, string arrangement, string engineering, viola, violin
- Ash Soan – Tom Toms drums
- Matt Snell – engineering
- Lorna Blackwood – programming, vocal production
- Cameron Gower Poole – vocal engineer
- Matty Green – mixing
- Chris Gehringer – mastering
- Will Quinnell – assistant mastering

== Charts ==
=== Weekly charts ===
Weekly chart performance
Chart (2020–2023)	Peak position
Argentina Hot 100 (Billboard)	41
Australia (ARIA)	60
Austria (Ö3 Austria Top 40)	50
Belarus Airplay (TopHit)	102
Belgium (Ultratop 50 Flanders)	5
Belgium (Ultratop 50 Wallonia)	2
Bulgaria Airplay (PROPHON)	2
Canada Hot 100 (Billboard)	11
Canada AC (Billboard)	10
Canada CHR/Top 40 (Billboard)	3
Canada Hot AC (Billboard)	3
CIS Airplay (TopHit)	26
Colombia (National-Report)	69
Croatia International Airplay (Top lista)	2
Czech Republic Airplay (ČNS IFPI)	1
Czech Republic Singles Digital (ČNS IFPI)	92
Finland Airplay (Radiosoittolista)	3
France (SNEP)	41
France Airplay (SNEP)	5
Germany (GfK)	44
Global 200 (Billboard)	59
Greece International (IFPI)	36
Hungary (Dance Top 40)	8
Hungary (Rádiós Top 40)	2
Hungary (Single Top 40)	8
Ireland (IRMA)	36
Italy (FIMI)	61
Kazakhstan Airplay (TopHit)	114
Lithuania (AGATA)	38
Mexico (Billboard Mexican Airplay)	5
Netherlands (Dutch Top 40)	3
Netherlands (Single Top 100)	21
New Zealand Hot Singles (RMNZ)	3
Poland Airplay (ZPAV)	2
Portugal (AFP)	92
Romania (Airplay 100)	24
Russia Airplay (TopHit)	88
San Marino Airplay (SMRTV Top 50)	5
Slovakia Airplay (ČNS IFPI)	7
Slovakia Singles Digital (ČNS IFPI)	47
Spain (Promusicae)	90
Switzerland (Schweizer Hitparade)	43
Ukraine Airplay (TopHit)	7
UK Singles (Official Charts)	51
US Billboard Hot 100	41
US Adult Contemporary (Billboard)	16
US Adult Pop Airplay (Billboard)	9
US Dance Airplay (Billboard)	12
US Pop Airplay (Billboard)	11

=== Monthly charts ===
Monthly chart performance
Chart (2021)	Peak position
CIS Airplay (TopHit)	29
Czech Republic (Rádio – Top 100)	1
Russia Airplay (TopHit)	98
Slovakia (Rádio – Top 100)	10
Slovakia (Singles Digitál Top 100)	59
Ukraine Airplay (TopHit)	10

=== Year-end charts ===
Year-end chart performance
Chart (2021)	Position
Belgium (Ultratop Flanders)	25
Belgium (Ultratop Wallonia)	18
Canada (Canadian Hot 100)	51
CIS Airplay (TopHit)	79
Croatia International Airplay (Top lista)	24
France (SNEP)	88
Global 200 (Billboard)	188
Hungary (Dance Top 40)	48
Hungary (Rádiós Top 40)	26
Hungary (Single Top 40)	34
Netherlands (Dutch Top 40)	28
Netherlands (Single Top 100)	76
Poland Airplay (ZPAV)	19
Ukraine Airplay (TopHit)	91
US Adult Top 40 (Billboard)	39
US Mainstream Top 40 (Billboard)	40

Year-end chart performance
Chart (2022)	Position
CIS Airplay (TopHit)	111
Croatia International Airplay (Top lista)	4
Hungary (Dance Top 40)	21
Hungary (Rádiós Top 40)	34
Poland Airplay (ZPAV)	91
Ukraine Airplay (TopHit)	24

Year-end chart performance
Chart (2023)	Position
CIS Airplay (TopHit)	200
Hungary (Dance Top 40)	57
Hungary (Rádiós Top 40)	81
Ukraine Airplay (TopHit)	52

Year-end chart performance
Chart (2025)	Position
Argentina Anglo Airplay (Monitor Latino)	57

== Certifications ==
Certifications
Region	Certification	Certified units/sales
Austria (IFPI Austria)	Platinum	30,000^{‡}
Brazil (Pro-Música Brasil)	Diamond	160,000^{‡}
Canada (Music Canada)	4× Platinum	320,000^{‡}
Denmark (IFPI Danmark)	Platinum	90,000^{‡}
France (SNEP)	Diamond	333,333^{‡}
Germany (BVMI)	Gold	200,000^{‡}
Italy (FIMI)	Platinum	70,000^{‡}
New Zealand (RMNZ)	2× Platinum	60,000^{‡}
Norway (IFPI Norway)	Gold	30,000^{‡}
Poland (ZPAV)	3× Platinum	150,000^{‡}
Portugal (AFP)	Platinum	10,000^{‡}
Spain (Promusicae)	Platinum	60,000^{‡}
United Kingdom (BPI)	Platinum	600,000^{‡}
United States (RIAA)	2× Platinum	2,000,000^{‡}
^{‡} Sales+streaming figures based on certification alone.

== Release history ==
Release dates and formats
Region	Date	Format(s)	Version	Label	Ref.
Various	11 September 2020	Digital download; streaming	Horse Meat Disco remix	Warner	
France	11 March 2021	Radio airplay	Radio edit	Warner	
Various	4 June 2021	Digital download; streaming	Original	Warner	
Italy	11 June 2021	Radio airplay	Radio edit	Warner	
United States	22 June 2021	Contemporary hit radio; adult contemporary radio; dance radio	Radio edit	Warner	
United States	6 July 2021	Contemporary hit radio	Radio edit	Warner	
United States	26 July 2021	Adult contemporary radio	Radio edit	Warner	
Various	1 October 2021	Digital download; streaming	Imanbek remix	Warner	
Various	15 October 2021	Digital download; streaming	Garabatto remix	Warner	

== See also ==
- List of number-one songs of the 2020s (Czech Republic)
- List of German airplay number-one songs of 2021
