= Tiny Winters =

English jazz bassist and vocalist (1909–1996)

- Born: 24 January 1909; London, United Kingdom
- Died: 7 February 1996 (aged 87) London, United Kingdom
- Genres: Jazz
- Instrument: Bass

Tiny Winters (Frederick Gittens, 24 January 1909 – 7 February 1996) was an English jazz bassist and vocalist who worked in the bands of Roy Fox, Bert Ambrose, Lew Stone and Ray Noble.

== Career ==
Winters joined Roy Fox in 1932 and stayed with the group when arranger Lew Stone took over as leader due to Fox's illness. He stayed with Stone until 1937 by which point he was also performing with Nat Gonella's 'band within a band', the Georgians. In 1934 he recorded with Coleman Hawkins during the saxophonist's 1934 visit to England and began leading his own bands from the late 30s.

Throughout the 1960s and 70s, he was part of a group led by George Chisholm that were regularly featured in the Black and White Minstrel Show, while continuing to freelance in various groups as well as with his own Palm House Trio. Winters continued to perform live in the 1980s and 90s often with trumpeter Digby Fairweather. In the 1990s he was awarded the Freedom of the City of London.
