= Midnight, the Stars and You =

1934 song by Harry M. Woods, Jimmy Campbell and Reginald Connelly

Single by Ray Noble's Mayfair Dance Orchestra, vocal Al Bowlly
- B-side: "An Hour Ago This Minute"
- Published: February 6, 1934 by Cinephonic Music Company, Ltd.
- Released: August 1934
- Recorded: February 16, 1934
- Studio: Abbey Road Studios 2, London, UK
- Genre: Popular Music, British dance band
- Length: 3:23
- Label: Victor 24700
- Songwriters: Harry M. Woods, Jimmy Campbell and Reginald Connelly

"Midnight, the Stars and You" is a British-American popular foxtrot song written by Harry M. Woods, Jimmy Campbell and Reg Connelly and published in 1934.

The most famous recorded version was performed in 1934 by Ray Noble and his Orchestra with an uncredited Al Bowlly on vocals. A foxtrot-tempo ballad, the song is considered one of Bowlly's "outstanding" vocal efforts.

Other recordings of this song contemporary to the Noble version are by Hal Kemp, Roy Fox, Harry Leader, Fred Hartley, and Maurice Elwin.

It is notable for appearing in Stanley Kubrick's 1980 horror film The Shining.

== Use in cinema and other media ==
The Bowlly rendition was used twice in Stanley Kubrick's 1980 classic horror film The Shining; once in the Gold Room (ballroom) scene, and also over the closing of the film as the camera closes in the protagonist in a photograph from the early 20th century, carrying over into the credits. The popularity of this film associated this version of the song to a sense of unease or impending menace in cinema and other media. These include:

- the 1981 horror film Dead & Buried,
- the title track of the 1994 album Bananaphone, while not a cover, follows the chord progression of this song exactly.
- the 1999 ambient album Selected Memories from the Haunted Ballroom,
- the 2005 comedy-drama Colour Me Kubrick,
- the 2006 comedy-horror Behind the Mask: The Rise of Leslie Vernon,
- the 2013 and 2018 thrillers Snowpiercer and The Outsider,
- the closing theme for The John Batchelor Show and The Last Podcast on the Left,
- in the first episode of the 2013 video game BioShock Infinite expansion Burial at Sea, while Booker and Elizabeth are searching for a missing girl named Sally in a bistro restaurant at Fontaine's Department Store,
- the 2018 film Ready Player One, which partially-recreated multiple scenes from The Shining as a major plot device, including the Gold Room scene where the song is featured.
- the 2019 film Toy Story 4 when Woody and Forky enter the antique store, continuing a trend of Pixar films referencing Kubrick films,
- "Girl's in the Band", the 19th episode in Season 30 of The Simpsons. In one scene Homer Simpson is losing his sanity due to sleep deprivation on a night shift at the power station, and finds himself in the ballroom of the Overlook Hotel. Homer dances with a woman as the song begins, and sits at the bar as it continues.
- The song is featured in the 2019 film adaptation of Doctor Sleep. A sequel to Kubrick's adaptation of The Shining, Doctor Sleep also features "Midnight, the Stars and You" twice. Abra faintly hears it while wandering the abandoned remains of the Overlook Hotel just moments before the building attempts to attack her; the song later appears in the closing moments of the film as Abra prepares to imprison an apparition of an undead woman that tormented Danny Torrance in the film's opening, before continuing to play over the credits (as in The Shining).
- In Season 46, Episode 15 of Saturday Night Live, the song is used in a skit with host and previous cast member Maya Rudolph, which pays homage to The Shining.
- Plays several times in the 2022 BritBox miniseries of Agatha Christie's Why Didn't They Ask Evans? adapted and directed by Hugh Laurie.
- the 2023 film The Critic
