= Love Is the Sweetest Thing =

1932 song by Ray Noble

Single by Ray Noble and His New Mayfair Dance Orchestra, vocal Al Bowlly
- B-side: I'll Do My Best to Make You Happy
- Published: November 9, 1932 by Francis, Day & Hunter Ltd., London, UK
- Released: June 30, 1933
- Recorded: September 8, 1932
- Studio: Abbey Road Studios 2, London, England
- Genre: Popular music, British dance band
- Length: 3:18
- Label: Victor 24333
- Songwriter: Ray Noble

Official Audio
- "Love Is the Sweetest Thing" on YouTube

"Love Is the Sweetest Thing" is a popular song written in 1932 by British band leader and singer Ray Noble. Using guest vocalist Al Bowlly, Noble's recording was a big hit on both sides of the Atlantic, bringing Noble his first American success. It was published by Francis, Day & Hunter Ltd. Like most compositions published in the period (commonly called Tin Pan Alley songs), its main refrain (in thirty-two bar A-A-B-A form) is preceded with what were then called "sectional verses" or "introductory verses" which are usually omitted from early recordings and modern performances.

== Notable recordings ==
The following artists, among others, have made recordings :-

- Ray Noble and His New Mayfair Orchestra (8 September 1932) – vocal by Al Bowlly.
- Jack Hylton and His Orchestra (4 October 1932) – vocal by J. Pat O'Malley.
- Jack Payne and His Orchestra (14 November 1932) – vocal by Jack Payne. Recorded for inclusion in the British musical drama film Say It with Music.
- Hal Kemp and His Orchestra (14 August 1933) – vocal by Skinnay Ennis.
- Perry Como – recorded circa mid-February, 1945 from a "Chesterfield Supper Club" radio broadcast and issued as a V-Disc Record Number A-444-B (Navy N-224-B).
- Mel Tormé (1946).
- Artie Shaw and His Orchestra (1950).
- Bing Crosby recorded the song in 1954 for use on his radio show and it was subsequently included in the box set The Bing Crosby CBS Radio Recordings (1954–56) issued by Mosaic Records (catalog MD7-245) in 2009.
- Mario Lanza – recorded for his Coca-Cola Radio Show in 1952 and included in the album The Touch of Your Hand (1955).
- Gogi Grant – included in her album Suddenly There's Gogi Grant (1956).
- Ferlin Husky – included in his album Sittin' on a Rainbow (1958).
- Frankie Vaughan – a single release in 1959.
- Dinah Washington – for her album Dinah Washington – In Love (1962).
- Operatic tenor, Saverio Saridis (The Singing Cop), went to number 86 on the US Billboard Hot 100 with his recording in 1962.
- Mary Hopkin – included in her album Post Card (1969).
- Peter Skellern – for the album Skellern (1978).

== Film appearances ==
- 1932 Say It with Music – performed by Jack Payne
- 1945 Confidential Agent – performed by Lynn Baggett at the road house
- 1956 Reach for the Sky
- 1959 The Lady Is a Square – sung by Frankie Vaughan
- 1959 The Captain's Table
- 1970 Country Dance – sung by Al Bowlly
- 1978 "The Sweetest Thing" (episode 2 of Pennies from Heaven) – sung by Al Bowlly
- 1980 Rising Damp
- 1990 Come See the Paradise – performed by Mark Earley
- 2004 Death on the Nile – the BBC-TV series with Sir David Suchet as Hercule Poirot – sung by Al Bowlly
- 2004 Spider-Man 2 – performed by Peter Cincotti and The Peter Cincotti Trio

== Lyrics extracts ==
First introductory verse:

Whether you're 20 and starting in life
Whether to 30 you've grown
Whether to 40, a husband or wife,
Whether you're 50, a Darby and Joan
There's one thing certain that you'll have to own...

Start of main refrain (nowadays "Verse One"):

Love is the sweetest thing
What else on earth could ever bring
Such happiness to ev'rything
As Love's old story.

End of main refrain (nowadays "Verse Three"):

Love is the greatest thing
The oldest yet, the latest thing
I only hope that fate may bring
Love's story to you.
