= ETS =

ETS or ets may refer to:

== Climate change, environment and economy ==
- Emissions trading scheme
  - European Union Emission Trading Scheme

== Organisations ==
- European Thermoelectric Society
- Evangelical Theological Society

=== Education ===
- École de technologie supérieure, an engineering school in Montreal, Canada
- Educational Testing Service, an American assessment organization
- Educational and Training Services Branch, of the British Army
- European Theological Seminary, in Kniebis, Germany

== Science and technology ==
- Endoscopic thoracic sympathectomy
- Enhanced Transmission Selection
- Enterprise test software
- Enterprise Transport Security, in computer security
- Environmental tobacco smoke
- Episodic tremor and slip
- ETS transcription factor family
- External transcribed spacer

== Transport ==
- East Tsim Sha Tsui station, of the Mass Transit Railway, Hong Kong
- Edmonton Transit Service, Alberta, Canada
- Electric train supply, which powers auxiliary systems on rail vehicles
- Enterprise Municipal Airport (Alabama)
- Eureka Transit Service, California, US
- Euskal Trenbide Sarea, a railway infrastructure company in the Basque Country, Spain
- KTM ETS, a high-speed train service in Malaysia

== Other uses ==
- Euro Truck Simulator, video game
- Afenmai language (ISO 639-3 code)
- European Training Strategy, of the European Commission
- Marie Hall Ets (1895–1984), American writer and illustrator
- Expiration of Term of Service, in US military separation
