= Tommy McQuater =

- McQuater at the 2006 Ealing Jazz Festival

Background information
- Born: Thomas Mossie McQuater; 4 September 1914
- Origin: Maybole, Ayrshire, Scotland
- Died: 20 January 2008 (aged 93)
- Genre: Jazz
- Instruments: Trumpet and flugelhorn

Thomas Mossie McQuater (4 September 1914 – 20 January 2008) was a Scottish jazz trumpeter.

== Biography ==
Born in Maybole, Ayrshire, McQuater was most notable for his work in the United Kingdom with Bert Ambrose in the 1930s, and also for some recordings made with George Chisholm and Benny Carter. McQuater showed musical talent from an early age. Largely self-taught, he began on the cornet and by the age of 11 was a regular member of the Maybole Burgh Band – a brass band that won several competitions in the late 1920s – and played at local events and dances.

McQuater turned professional in his teens and got a regular position with Louis Freeman's Band, which played at Greens Playhouse in Glasgow.

In 1934, aged 20, McQuater was offered a job with one of London's most renowned bands: the Jack Payne Orchestra, which played in London and Paris. The following year he joined Lew Stone's band and made the classic recording of "Pardon Me, Pretty Baby". In the 1940s, McQuater joined The Squadronaires.

Leaving the Squadronaires at the end of the 1940, McQuater joined the Skyrockets at the London Palladium for over a year. From 1952 he joined the BBC Show band and started to broadcast regularly with Kenny Baker's Dozen. He freelanced widely in the 1960s, with sessions for radio, television and films and appeared regularly with Jack Parnell's ATV Orchestra.

He can be heard in the signature music for Steptoe and Son, on backing tracks for Thunderbirds and on many of hit records. His TV work included his playing the featured trumpet parts in The Muppet Show, throughout its 1976 - 1981 run.

McQuater often performed with John McLevy in the 1970s and 1980s. In his later years, he concentrated his energy and playing around the Ealing Jazz Festival.

== Death ==
He died in London, aged 93, and was survived by his two sons.

== Select discography ==
With Johnny Dankworth

- Fall Guy (Parlophone)

With George Chisholm

- Early Days 1935-1944 (Timeless Holland)

With Bert Ambrose & His Orchestra

- When Day Is Done (ASV Records)

With Kenny Baker

- Kenny Baker's Dozen Play Not Quite Two Dozen (Jasmine Records)

With Tommy Watt and His Orchestra

- Watt's Cooking (Bethlehem Records)

With The Vile Bodies Swing Band

- A Nightingale Sang in Berkeley Square (Pickwick Records)
