= Goodnight Sweetheart (Ray Noble, Jimmy Campbell and Reg Connelly song) =

1931 British popular song

"Goodnight Sweetheart"
Sung by Al Bowlly with the Ray Noble Orchestra

Sheet music cover featuring Rudy Vallée

"Goodnight, Sweetheart" is a British popular song written in 1931. It has been performed by Al Bowlly, Kate Smith, Connie Francis (for her 1959 album My Thanks to You), Dick Haymes (for his Imagination album), Gordon MacRae (for his 1957 album Motion Picture Soundstage), Sarah Vaughan (for her 1962 album Sarah + 2) and Dean Martin (for his 1958 album Sleep Warm) , among others, and was the theme song for the 1990s BBC time-travel sitcom Goodnight Sweetheart starring Nicholas Lyndhurst, which was named after it.

"Goodnight, Sweetheart" was written in 1931 by the song-writing team of Ray Noble, Jimmy Campbell and Reg Connelly.

It was recorded on 19 February 1931 by Ray Noble's New Mayfair Dance Orchestra (vocals by Al Bowlly), the Wayne King Orchestra (vocals by Ernie Birchill), Russ Columbo, Bing Crosby, and Ruth Etting. Guy Lombardo also recorded his own version of the song in 1931 with vocals by Carmen Lombardo.

In film, the song was performed in Angel's Holiday with Jane Withers (1937), The Palm Beach Story (1942; performed by Rudy Vallée), Stage Door Canteen (1943; sung by Kenny Baker), and Holiday in Mexico (1946; excerpt sung by Walter Pidgeon and Jane Powell). It was also featured in the Star Trek episode "The City on the Edge of Forever". 1950 "Father of the Bride"

On television, a version by Nick Curtis was used as the theme tune for the 1990s sitcom of the same name, Goodnight Sweetheart. It also featured as the closing theme on mid-century radio show The Adventures of Sam Spade.
