= List of German airplay number-one songs of 2021 =

The official German Airplay Chart is an airplay chart compiled by Nielsen Music Control on behalf of Bundesverband Musikindustrie (Federal Association of Phonographic Industry).

== Chart history ==
Key
‡	Indicates singles which also reached the top of the German singles chart

Issue date	Title	Artist(s)	Ref.
1 January	"Running Back To You"	Martin Jensen, Alle Farben and Nico Santos	
8 January	"Running Back To You"	Martin Jensen, Alle Farben and Nico Santos	
15 January	"All We Got"	Robin Schulz featuring Kiddo	
22 January	"All We Got"	Robin Schulz featuring Kiddo	
29 January	"All We Got"	Robin Schulz featuring Kiddo	
5 February	"Paradise"	Meduza featuring Dermot Kennedy	
12 February	"Prisoner"	Miley Cyrus featuring Dua Lipa	
19 February	"Prisoner"	Miley Cyrus featuring Dua Lipa	
26 February	"Prisoner"	Miley Cyrus featuring Dua Lipa	
5 March	"My Head & My Heart"	Ava Max	
12 March	"Afterglow"	Ed Sheeran	
19 March	"Girls Like Us"	Zoe Wees	
26 March	"Girls Like Us"	Zoe Wees	
2 April	"Girls Like Us"	Zoe Wees	
9 April	"Girls Like Us"	Zoe Wees	
16 April	"Girls Like Us"	Zoe Wees	
23 April	"Your Love (9PM)"	ATB, Topic and A7S	
30 April	"Cover Me in Sunshine"	Pink and Willow Sage Hart	
7 May	"Cover Me in Sunshine"	Pink and Willow Sage Hart	
14 May	"Cover Me in Sunshine"	Pink and Willow Sage Hart	
21 May	"Cover Me in Sunshine"	Pink and Willow Sage Hart	
28 May	"Fireworks"	Purple Disco Machine featuring Moss Kena and The Knocks	
4 June	"One More Time"	Robin Schulz and Felix Jaehn featuring Alida	
11 June	"One More Time"	Robin Schulz and Felix Jaehn featuring Alida	
18 June	"River"	Tom Gregory	
25 June	"River"	Tom Gregory	
2 July	"Iko Iko"	Justin Wellington featuring Small Jam	
9 July	"Iko Iko"	Justin Wellington featuring Small Jam	
16 July	"Iko Iko"	Justin Wellington featuring Small Jam	
23 July	"Iko Iko"	Justin Wellington featuring Small Jam	
30 July	"Iko Iko"	Justin Wellington featuring Small Jam	
6 August	"Iko Iko"	Justin Wellington featuring Small Jam	
13 August	"Bad Habits" ‡	Ed Sheeran	
20 August	"Bad Habits" ‡	Ed Sheeran	
27 August	"Bad Habits" ‡	Ed Sheeran	
3 September	"Bad Habits" ‡	Ed Sheeran	
10 September	"Bad Habits" ‡	Ed Sheeran	
17 September	"Bad Habits" ‡	Ed Sheeran	
24 September	"Bad Habits" ‡	Ed Sheeran	
1 October	"Bad Habits" ‡	Ed Sheeran	
8 October	"Stay" ‡	The Kid Laroi and Justin Bieber	
15 October	"Stay" ‡	The Kid Laroi and Justin Bieber	
22 October	"Love Again"	Dua Lipa	
29 October	"Love Again"	Dua Lipa	
5 November	"Would I Lie to You"	Nico Santos	
12 November	"Dopamine"	Purple Disco Machine featuring Eyelar	
19 November	"Dopamine"	Purple Disco Machine featuring Eyelar	
26 November	"Dopamine"	Purple Disco Machine featuring Eyelar	
3 December	"Dopamine"	Purple Disco Machine featuring Eyelar	
10 December	"Shivers" ‡	Ed Sheeran	
17 December	"Shivers" ‡	Ed Sheeran	
24 December	"Alright"	Alle Farben featuring Kiddo	
31 December	"Alright"	Alle Farben featuring Kiddo	
