= George Chisholm (musician) =

Scottish jazz trombonist and singer (1915–1997)

- Born: 29 March 1915; Glasgow, Scotland
- Died: 6 December 1997 (aged 82) Milton Keynes, Buckinghamshire, England
- Genre: Jazz
- Instrument: Trombone
- Years active: 1934-mid-1990s

George Chisholm (29 March 1915 – 6 December 1997) was a Scottish trad and mainstream jazz trombonist and vocalist, whose career lasted for over sixty years.

== Biography ==
Chisholm's engineer father was a drummer and his mother a pianist. At the age of 14, he began playing piano at the Dalmarnock Road Cinema in Glasgow accompanying silent films. He later took up the trombone. He performed at the Tower Ballroom and Glasgow Playhouse in the early 1930s.

In 1936 he moved from Scotland to London, where he played in dance bands led by Bert Ambrose and Teddy Joyce, and joined the resident band at the Nest Club, 12 Kingly Street in Soho, performing and occasionally recording with US jazz musicians such as Coleman Hawkins, Fats Waller and Benny Carter during their visits to London. According to the Penguin Jazz Guide, Chisholm "had few peers on the slide horn outside the US at this period". His 1930s recordings include a session with the Jazz Five – Tommy McQuater (clarinet), Benny Winestone (clarinet, tenor sax), Eddie Macauley (piano), Tiny Winters (bass) and Dudley Barber (drums) – in October 1938. He also recorded with Danny Polo's Swing Stars during this period, and with Fats Waller at the Abbey Road Studios in 1939.

In 1940, during the Second World War, Chisholm signed on with the Royal Air Force and joined the RAF Dance Orchestra (known popularly as the Squadronaires), remaining in the band until 1950, long after he was demobbed; he followed this with freelance work. In 1952, he began a five-year stint with the BBC Showband, a forerunner of the BBC Radio Orchestra led by Cyril Stapleton.

Chisholm moved into radio, television and film work in the 1950s and 1960s. He was a core member of Wally Stott's orchestra on BBC Radio's The Goon Show. He made several minor acting appearances in the show, for example as Chisholm MacChisholm the Steaming Celt in the 1956 episode "The Macreekie Rising of '74". He also contributed to radio shows including Band Wagon, It's That Man Again and Much-Binding-in-the-Marsh. He joined The Black and White Minstrel Show in 1961 for a decade, and appeared in the films The Mouse on the Moon (1963), The Knack ...and How to Get It (1965) and Superman III (1983). He was also part of the house band for the children's programmes Play School and Play Away. He also sang and was a storyteller on Play School occasionally.

Chisholm's recorded legacy is slight, but there are some later recordings of a 1973 date alongside Kenny Baker, Tony Coe, Tommy Whittle and others. There is also a 48 track sampling of his work spanning 1937 to 1962, which was issued as a centenary tribute in 2015.

During the 1980s Chisholm continued to play, despite undergoing heart surgery, working with his own band, the Gentlemen of Jazz, and Keith Smith's Hefty Jazz among others. He also played live with touring artists and brass bands, including the Royal Doulton Band. He was appointed an OBE in 1984. Chisholm retired from public life in the mid-1990s, suffering from Alzheimer's disease. He died in hospital in Milton Keynes, Buckinghamshire, in December 1997, aged 82.
