= John McLevy =

- Birth name: John McLevy
- Born: 2 January 1927; Dundee, Scotland, UK
- Origin: Dundee, Scotland
- Died: 27 November 2002 (aged 75); UK
- Genres: Jazz
- Instrument(s): trumpet flugelhorn

John McLevy (born 2 January 1927, Dundee, Scotland – died 27 November 2002) was a Scottish jazz trumpeter.

He played in Europe for Benny Goodman in the 1970s, alongside George Masso, Hank Jones and Slam Stewart. He performed with artists such as Max Bygraves, Roy Williams, accordionist Jack Emblow and later in a duo with veteran trumpeter Tommy McQuater.
