= What More Can I Ask? =

Song by A. E. Wilkins and Ray Noble

Single by Al Bowlly
- B-side: "Brighter Than The Sun"
- Released: December 14, 1932
- Genre: Jazz, British Dance Band
- Length: 3:33
- Label: His Master's Voice
- Songwriter(s): Ray Noble; A. E. Wilkins

What More Can I Ask? is a popular song written in 1932 with lyrics by A. E. Wilkins and music by Ray Noble.

The Anona Winn version was used in the soundtrack of The Little Damozel.

== Recordings ==
1	Al Bowlly with Ray Noble and his orchestra Gramophone B 6302 (matrix: 0B 4365-1); Recorded London on December 14, 1932
2	Al Bowlly with Lew Stone and the Monseigneur Band; Decca(England) F 3373 (matrix: GB 5398-1); Recorded London on December 23, 1932
3	Anna Neagle with orchestra conducted by Ray Noble; Gramophone B 4365 (matrix: 0B 4586-3); Recorded January 4, 1933
4	Anona Winn; Regal Zonophone Records G 21675 (matrix: CA 13346-1); Recorded London January 13, 1933
5	Sam Browne and Anona Winn (as Jack and Jill); Regal Zonophone Records G 21691 (matrix: CAR 1726-1); Recorded London February 2, 1933
