= Imagination (Dick Haymes album) =

Compilation album by Dick Haymes
- Released: 1982
- Genre: Pop, Jazz
- Label: Audiophile AP-79

Professional ratings
Review scores
Source	Rating
Allmusic	

Imagination is a compilation album from Dick Haymes released in 1982.

Tracks 3, 7, 21-26 with the Carmen Dragon Orchestra (recorded in LA, 1949).

Tracks 2, 4-6, 27 with Al Lerner and his Orchestra (recorded in LA 29.09, 1952).

The CD version includes 14 additional tracks.

== Track listing (CD release, CD bonus tracks noted) ==
1. "Zing! Went the Strings of My Heart" (James F. Hanley) from the MGM musical film Listen, Darling.
2. "Imagination" (Jimmy Van Heusen / Johnny Burke)
3. "The Object Of My Affection" (Grier/Poe/Tomlin)
4. "It's the Talk of the Town" (Livingston/Symes/Neilburg)
5. "What's New?" (Bob Haggart / Johnny Burke)
6. "I Could Write a Book" (Richard Rodgers & Lorenz Hart) from the Show Pal Joey
7. "My Blue Heaven" (Walter Donaldson / George A. Whiting)
8. "Music, Maestro, Please!"—on CD release only
9. "I've Got You Under My Skin" (Cole Porter) -- on CD release only
10. "These Foolish Things (Remind Me Of You)" (Harry Link / Jack Strachey / Eric Maschwitz) -- on CD release only
11. "Of All Things"—on CD release only
12. "Where In The World"—on CD release only
13. "Wishing (Will Make It So)"—on CD release only
14. "If I Loved You" (Richard Rodgers & Oscar Hammerstein II) from the Show Carousel—on CD release only
15. "My Love Loves Me"—on CD release only
16. "Thinking of You"—on CD release only
17. "Sunny Disposish"—on CD release only
18. "But Not for Me" (George Gershwin & Ira Gershwin) from the Show Girl Crazy—on CD release only
19. "Why Can't You Behave? "(Cole Porter) from the Show Kiss Me, Kate—on CD release only
20. "By The Fountain In The Park"—on CD release only
21. "Younger than Springtime" (Rodgers & Hammerstein) from the Show South Pacific
22. "Bali Ha'i" (Rodgers & Hammerstein) from the Show South Pacific
23. "Some Enchanted Evening" (Rodgers & Hammerstein) from the Show South Pacific
24. "Here In My Arms" (Rodgers & Hart) from the Show Dearest Enemy
25. "Could Be" (Marty Clarke & Bob Haymes)
26. "There's a Small Hotel" (Rodgers & Hart) from the Show On Your Toes
27. "Goodnight, Sweetheart" (Noble/Campbell/Connelly)
28. "I'll See You In My Dreams" (Isham Jones / Gus Kahn) -- on CD release only
