= Roy Fox =

American-British bandleader (1901–1982)

Background information
- Born: Roy Clifton Fox; 25 October 1901; Denver, Colorado, US
- Died: 20 March 1982 (aged 80) Twickenham, Middlesex, England
- Genres: Swing music Big band British dance band
- Occupation: Dance bandleader
- Instrument: Cornet
- Years active: 1914-1952
- Labels: Decca, His Master's Voice

Roy Clifton Fox (October 25, 1901 – March 20, 1982) was an American-born British dance bandleader who was popular in Britain during the British dance band era of the 1930s.

== Early life and career ==
Roy Clifton Fox was born in Denver, Colorado, United States in 1901. His father, Joseph Wilbur Fox, was a carpenter. Roy and his musician sister Vera were raised in Hollywood, California, in a Salvation Army family. Fox began playing cornet when he was 11 years old, and by age 13 was performing in the Los Angeles Examiner's newsboys' band.

He got a job as a bank messenger, but soon took up music full-time. He was employed as a Music supervisor at Fox Film Studios, but soon concentrated on playing. His first major association came at the age of 16, when he joined Abe Lyman's orchestra at the Sunset Inn in Santa Monica, where he played alongside Miff Mole, Gussie Mueller, Henry Halstead, and Gus Arnheim. He developed a soft style of playing there which earned him the nickname "The Whispering Cornetist".

== Fame as bandleader ==
In 1920, he put together his own band, with whom he recorded in 1925. That same year he also scored a gig on radio broadcasting with Art Hickman's orchestra; this ensemble toured the U.S., then did an extended residency in Florida. After some time in New York City, Fox and Arnheim reconvened in Hollywood, working at the Ambassador Hotel, and Fox continued to broadcast with his own bands. During this time he also did a number of film soundtracks.

In 1929, Fox was invited to lead a band based at the Café de Paris in London, which he first did on September 29, 1930. He recorded on the BBC that year, and when his band returned to the U.S. the following spring, Fox remained behind, recording with a new group for Decca Records (also acting as musical director for the label) and accepting an engagement at the Monseigneur restaurant in Piccadilly starting in May 1931. His band included Lew Stone, Bill Harty, Harry Berly, Sid Buckman, Nat Gonella and Al Bowlly.

In 1932, he fell ill with pleurisy and travelled to Switzerland for a stay at a sanatorium. During his convalescence the band was led by its pianist, Lew Stone. Upon Fox's return he resumed control of the band but when the Monseigneur contract came up for renewal in the autumn of 1932, was unable to agree terms. The restaurant's owner then offered the residency to Stone and all the band, all left with the exception of trumpeter Sid Buckman, who decided to remain with Stone. Fox took out an injunction on the grounds of breach of contract against his singer, Al Bowlly, which prevented Bowlly performing with Stone's band on the first night; however, Fox lost his action.

Fox formed a new band with Buckman as trumpeter and vocalist, secured a residency at the Café Anglais in Leicester Square, London, and performed in Belgium as well as at home in the UK. Art Christmas played a variety of instruments in this band. Among his vocalists were Denny Dennis and Mary Lee, whilst his musicians included Jack Jackson, Nat Gonella and Harry Gold. In 1933, the band performed as part of the Royal Command Performance at the London Palladium, and the following year embarked on a tour of Britain.

Fox appeared in the films On the Air (1934) and Radio Pirates (also known as Big Ben Calling) the following year. In January 1936, he moved to the His Master's Voice label, and toured Europe until 1938, when he fell ill again, and broke up the band.

== War and post-war years ==
The Roy Fox band disbanded in 1938, and Fox moved to Australia, where he led the Jay Whidden Orchestra. Upon the outbreak of the Second World War, with his British passport taken away, he had no choice but to return to his native America, rather than go back to Britain. In New York, he went into a residency at the La Martinique, from which he broadcast weekly. He then moved to a new club, the Riobamba, on 57th Street, at which the floor show included a young Frank Sinatra, who was making his solo nightclub debut, and told Fox that he was the worst conductor he had ever worked with. Fox told him off, but they became good friends. He then went to the Savoy-Plaza Hotel, a venue popular with high society, which was opposite Central Park.

He led a band back in Britain from 1946 to 1947, with appearances at the Isle of Man, London's Potomac Club and The Coronation Ballroom in Ramsgate. He also briefly resumed recording in this period, returning to his old label, Decca, with whom he released several more 78s. Fox went into semi-retirement after 1952, when he opened his own booking agency. His autobiography, Hollywood, Mayfair, and All That Jazz (1975) is still in print.

== Personal life and death ==
Fox was married three times. His first wife, Dorothea, was a showgirl who appeared in the Marx Brothers' musical The Cocoanuts on Broadway. In 1943, he wed the singer Kay Kimber. They had two children, Fredrick Rea and Amanda Kathryn, but later divorced, and Fox married actress Eileen O'Donnell, whom he had met in Dublin. The couple had a son, Gary.

Fox had a house in Highgate, north London, before moving to a flat in Chelsea, next to where the Decca studios were located at the time. Unable to pay the rent on the flat, he ended up in Brinsworth House in Twickenham, the retirement home for variety performers run by the Entertainment Artistes Benevolent Fund. He died in Twickenham, Middlesex in 1982, aged 80. His younger relatives include American LGBT organizer/activist Toni Armstrong Jr.
