= Enterprise test software =

Software testing and quality control tool

Enterprise test software (ETS) is a type of software that electronics manufacturers and other manufacturers use to standardize product testing enterprise-wide, rather than simply in the test engineering department. It is designed to integrate and synchronize test systems to other enterprise functions such as research and development (R&D), new product introduction (NPI), manufacturing, and supply chain, overseeing the collaborative test processes between engineers and managers in their respective departments.

== Details ==
Like most enterprise software subcategories, ETS represents an evolution away from custom-made, in-house software development by original equipment manufacturers (OEMs). It typically replaces a cumbersome, unsophisticated, test management infrastructure that manufacturers have to redesign for every new product launch. Some large companies, such as Alcatel, Cisco, and Nortel, develop ETS systems internally to standardize and accelerate their test engineering activities, while others such as Harris Corporation and Freescale Semiconductor choose commercial off-the-shelf ETS options for advantages that include test data management and report generation. This need results from the extensive characterization efforts associated with IC design, characterization, validation, and verification. ETS accelerates design improvements through test system management and version control.

ETS supports test system development and can be interconnected with manufacturing execution systems (MES), enterprise resource planning (ERP), and product lifecycle management (PLM) software packages to eliminate double-data entry and enable real-time information sharing throughout all company departments.

== Enterprise-wide test applications ==
ETS covers five major enterprise-wide test applications.

- Test and automation—By using ETS in conjunction with virtual instrumentation programming tools, design and test engineers avoid custom software programming unrelated to device characterization, and can thereby accelerate test system development.
- Product data management—In this application, the engineer collects, stores, aggregates, distributes, and shares product and test data in a central database. One significant advantage of ETS is reported to be product traceability. It is designed to make performance reporting easier, and to increase the chances that products are built correctly, from the first prototype, reducing design iterations.
- Process control—The engineer manages the flow of activities between test, repair, and assembly stations, and enforces or suggests how a set of work instructions are to be applied. This application is designed to orchestrate product test strategies from validation to delivery.
- Multi-site collaboration—This purpose of this application is avoid time zone difficulties and error-prone updates of new product and test system releases, by sharing information with other departments and remote contract manufacturers electronically. It is designed to offer real-time visibility over global test operations.
- Test asset management—This application is intended to help design and test engineers track product configurations, tolerances, test sequences, and software being used by each test system, as well as distribute new updates electronically in real-time. Engineers can update their test systems automatically, in synch with their new releases.

== See also ==
- Commercial off-the-shelf
- Electronic test equipment
- Enterprise Data Management
- Enterprise resource planning
- Process control
- Test automation
