= Say It with Music (1932 film) =

1932 film

- Jack Payne and his band in the film
- Directed by: Jack Raymond
- Written by: William Pollock
- Produced by: Herbert Wilcox
- Starring: Jack Payne; Percy Marmont; Evelyn Roberts
- Cinematography: Osmond Borradaile
- Music by: Lew Stone
- Production company: British and Dominions
- Distributed by: Woolf & Freedman Film Service
- Release date: 14 November 1932
- Running time: 69 minutes
- Country: United Kingdom
- Language: English

Say It with Music is a 1932 British musical drama film directed by Jack Raymond and starring Jack Payne, Percy Marmont and Evelyn Roberts. It was written by William Pollock, and produced by Herbert Wilcox's British and Dominions Films at Elstree Studios. It takes its title from the 1921 song Say It with Music by Irving Berlin which features in the soundtrack, and was an early example of a string of bandleader-centric films produced by British studios during the decade.

It is notable for providing an early acting role for the then-24-year-old William Hartnell, who decades later would go on to portray the First Doctor in Doctor Who.

== Plot ==
Composer Philip Weston, a former First World War pilot now battling amnesia, finds it impossible to sell his work, as he is unable to adapt his talent to the current demand for dance music. He accidentally meetis Jack Payne, who insists they know each other, though Weston fails to recognise him. Weston's wife subsequently contacts Payne, who reveals that his own most popular melody was actually inspired by one of Weston's themes. Payne promptly reimburses her and resolves to help Weston recover his memory and lost confidence. With the assistance of a doctor, the plan succeeds, and Weston is greeted with tumultuous applause from the audience when he performs his own composition.

== Cast ==
- Jack Payne as himself
- Percy Marmont as Philip Weston
- Evelyn Roberts as Dr. Longfellow
- Sybil Summerfield as Betty Weston
- Joyce Kennedy as Mrs. Weston
- BBC Dance Orchestra as themselves
- Freddy Schweitzer as himself
- Anna Lee
- William Hartnell

== Reception ==
Film Weekly wrote: "Jack Payne's legion of admirers will rush to say it with two-and-fourpences at the first opportunity they get of seeing their idol and his ex BBC boys on the screen, and they will be more than delighted with their investment. ... Say It With Music is surefire entertainment for every lover of 'popular' melodies."

Kine Weekly wrote: "Jack Raymond has made Jack Payne and his Band the centrepiece of this popular attraction, and builds the light, sentimental drama cleverly around them. Although the footage is almost entirely devoted to dance music, monotony is cleverly averted, by the introduction of pleasing by-play in which an elaborate war-time flashback plays a prominent part. Orchestration'is good, and the numbers are put over with the conductor's undoubted flair for showmanship."

Picturegoer wrote: "Jack himself shows distinct possibilities as an actor, but it is the music and the presentation of the tuneful numbers that really make the picture. This is done quite skilfully, and it is safe to say that the thousands of admirers of the famous dance band and its leader ... will be melodiously entertained."
