= Bill Harty =

Irish-born jazz musician (1899–1959)

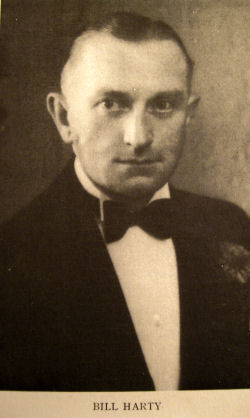
Bill Harty, known for being the drummer in Ray Noble's orchestra.

William John Harty (14 January 1899 – 29 May 1959) was an Irish-born dance band drummer.

== Career ==
Born in Waterford in Ireland in 1899, Harty moved to Birmingham in England after World War I and took up the drums while working for the Dunlop Tyre Company. He played with various local bands on the early Birmingham jazz scene before deputising with an American band at the Birmingham Palais. He toured around Europe for much of the 1920s before returning to England to play with bands led by Harry Shalson, Al Starita, Jean Pougnet, Bill Gerhardi, Percival Mackey, Arthur Lally and Lew Stone. He was Ray Noble's preferred drummer for the studio recordings he made with The New Mayfair Dance Orchestra between 1929 and 1934. In 1934, Harty also became Noble's manager, sailing to the United States with him and vocalist Al Bowlly later that year, to organise a touring band there. He remained Noble's manager and drummer into the 1950s. He died in Los Angeles, California.

== Bibliography ==
=== References ===
- Chilton, John James (1932–2016) (2004) [1996, 1997, 1998]. "Harty, 'Bill' William John". Who's Who of British Jazz (2nd ed.). Continuum. pp. 166–167 – via Internet Archive (ARChive of Contemporary Music). LCCN 2003-68805; ISBN 0-8264-7234-6, ISBN 978-0-8264-2389-4, 0-8264-2389-2; OCLC 320324851 (all editions).
