= European Training Strategy =

European Commission programme

The European Training Strategy (ETS) of the European Commission outlines findings, objectives, and measures to sustain the quality and recognition of youth work in Europe. It was introduced as part of the European Union's YOUTH programme (2000-2006) and is revised regularly in accordance with new youth programmes going into effect. The most recent version adapts to Erasmus+, covering the time period between 2014 and 2020.

== Conceptual Framework ==
The current version of the ETS is closely associated with a 2009 resolution by the Council of the European Union that describes the "renewed framework for European cooperation in the youth field". Based upon several recommendations within the resolution, the ETS determines the concept of capacity building as a key instrument to address the multifaceted aspects of youth work. In the context of the ETS, capacity building is defined adhering to the three analytical levels of analysis.

- Micro-level - Human resource development: Strategies and measures to equip individuals working in youth work as employees, freelancers or volunteers with five professional competences (knowledge, skills, attitudes) and access to information, knowledge, and training that enables them to perform effectively.
- Meso-level - Organisational development: The elaboration of awareness, strategies, processes and procedures within a youth work organisation, but also in relationships between the different organisations and sectors (public, private, and community).
- Macro-level - Systemic framework development: Making regulatory changes or creating systems and structures to enable organisations, institutions, and agencies at all levels and in all parts of youth work to enhance their capacities.

== Objectives ==
Incorporating its initial definition of capacity building, the ETS outlines six main objectives for sustaining quality youth work through capacity building. Each objective relates to multiple sets of measures to be implemented under different Key Actions within Erasmus+. Key Actions are the general framework for activities and projects that can be funded through the programme and cover three main areas: mobility of individuals (Key Action 1), cooperation for innovation (Key Action 2) and exchange of good practices, and support for policy reform (Key Action 3).

The ETS pursues the following objectives

- Encourage cooperation between the different stakeholders throughout Europe.
- Generate more knowledge about capacity building and its impact on youth work.
- Develop a modular system and a set of competences to train trainers.
- Develop a modular system and a set of competences to train youth workers.
- Offer capacity building tools at the European level.
- Support competence building within the Erasmus+ National Agencies for the field of youth and their staff.
