= Ray Noble =

English jazz and big band musician (1903–1978)

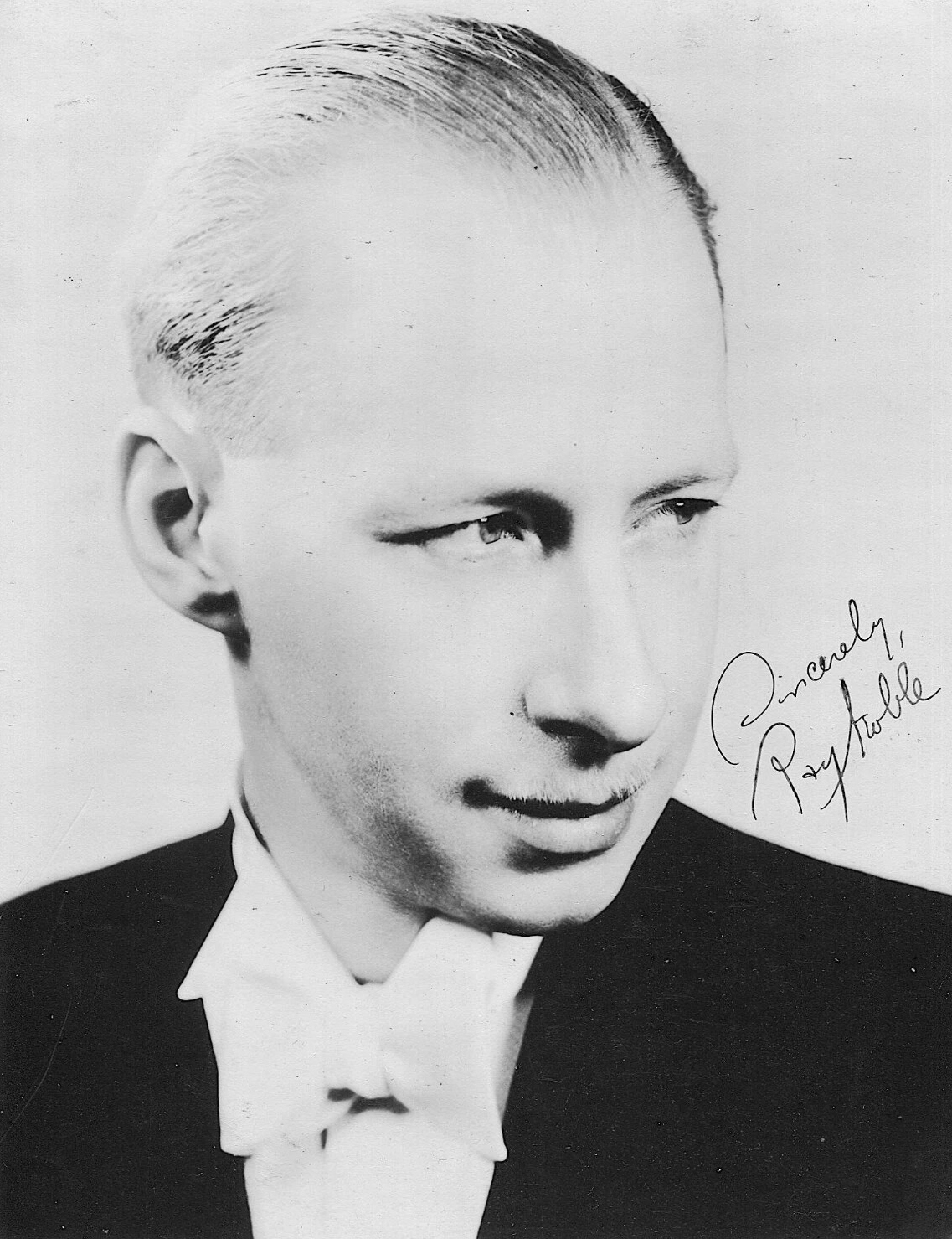
- An autographed 1935 photo of Noble

Background information
- Born: Raymond Stanley Noble; 17 December 1903; Brighton, Sussex, England
- Origin: Royal Academy of Music
- Died: 2 April 1978 (aged 74) London, England
- Genres: Jazz, british dance band
- Occupations: Bandleader; composer; arranger; comedian; actor
- Instruments: Piano
- Years active: 1929–1960s
- Labels: His Master's Voice, RCA Victor

Raymond Stanley Noble (17 December 1903 – 3 April 1978) was an English jazz and big band musician, who was a bandleader, composer and arranger, as well as a radio host, television and film comedian and actor; he also performed in the United States. He is best known for his signature tune, "The Very Thought of You", and for "Cherokee".

Noble wrote both lyrics and music for many popular songs during the British dance band era, known as the "Golden Age of British music", notably for his longtime friend and associate Al Bowlly. His most iconic musical numbers included songs such as "Love Is the Sweetest Thing", "Cherokee", "The Touch of Your Lips", "I Hadn't Anyone Till You", Goodnight, Sweetheart, What More Can I Ask?, and "The Very Thought of You". Noble played a radio comedian opposite American ventriloquist Edgar Bergen's stage act of Mortimer Snerd and Charlie McCarthy, and American comedy duo Burns and Allen, later transferring these roles from radio to TV and popular films.

== Early life and career ==
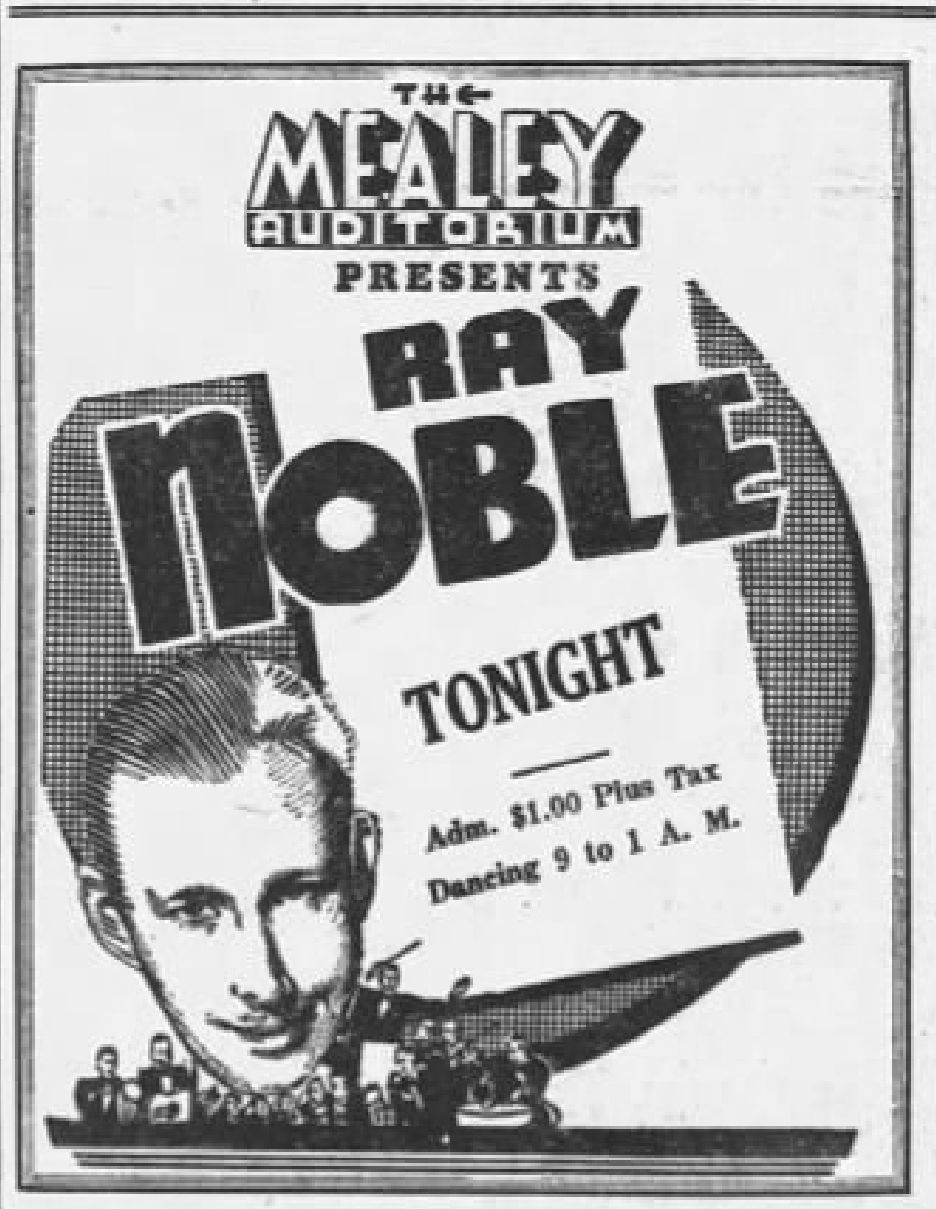
A concert advertisement

Noble was born at 1 Montpelier Terrace in the Montpelier area of Brighton, England. A blue plaque on the house commemorates him. He was the nephew of the Anglican church music composer T. Tertius Noble (1867–1953).

Noble studied at the Royal Academy of Music and in 1927 won a competition for the best British dance band orchestrator that was advertised in Melody Maker. In 1929, he became leader of the New Mayfair Dance Orchestra, a His Master's Voice studio band that featured members of many of the top hotel orchestras of the day. Noble recorded prolifically during this time and US Victor released several of his His Master's Voice recordings, including "Butterflies in the Rain", "Mademoiselle", "My Hat's on the Side of My Head" and "The Very Thought of You".

The most popular vocalist with Noble's studio band was Al Bowlly, who joined in 1930. During this time, Noble co-wrote "Turkish Delight", "By the Fireside" and "Goodnight, Sweetheart". The latter song was a number one hit for Guy Lombardo in the American charts. It was also used (with vocals by Al Bowlly) on the original Star Trek television series episode "The City on the Edge of Forever".

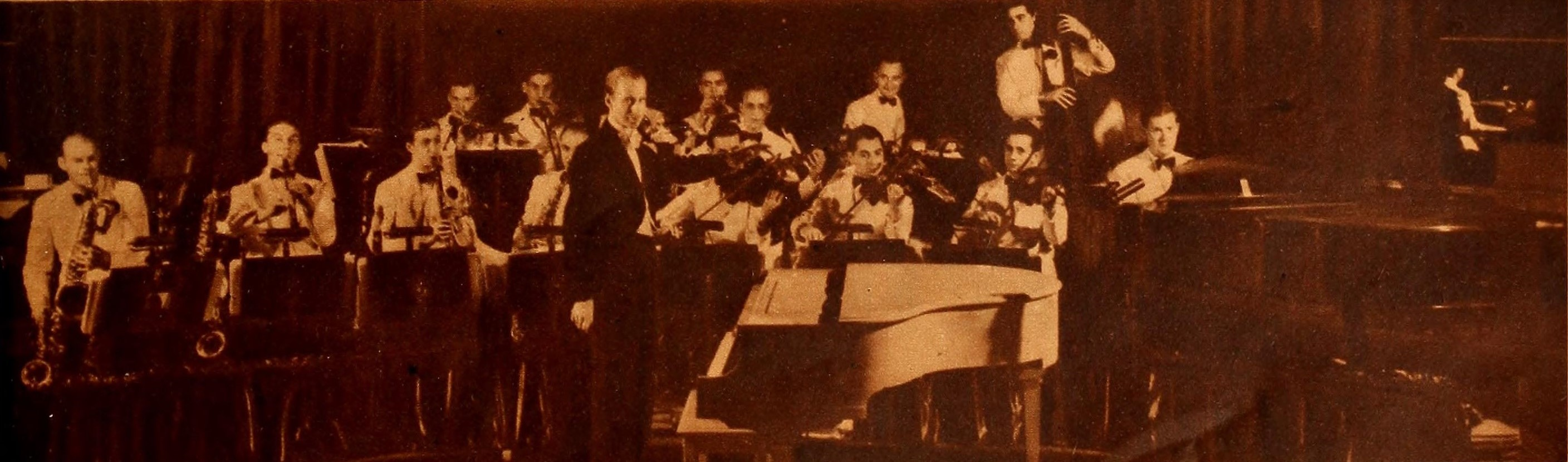

== Career in the United States ==
Noble moved to New York City in 1934. The Bowlly/Noble recordings with the British New Mayfair Dance Orchestra on His Master's Voice had achieved popularity in the United States and Noble had successes there.

Noble took Al Bowlly and his drummer Bill Harty to the US and asked trombonist Glenn Miller to recruit American musicians to complete the band. Miller played the Trombone in the Ray Noble orchestra, which performed Glenn Miller's composition "Dese Dem Dose" as part of the medley "Dese Dem Dose/An Hour Ago This Minute/Solitude" during a performance at the Rainbow Room in 1935. The American Ray Noble band had a successful run at the Rainbow Room in New York City with Bowlly as principal vocalist.

Although Noble was not a singer, he did appear twice as an upper-class Englishman on two of his more popular New York records, 1935's "Top Hat" and 1937's "Slumming on Park Avenue". Noble was also an arranger who scored many record hits in the 1930s: "Goodnight, Sweetheart" (1931), "Mad About the Boy" (1932), "Paris in the Spring" (1935), "Blue Danube" (1932), "The Very Thought of You" (1934), "Love Is the Sweetest Thing" (1932), "I've Got My Love to Keep Me Warm" (1937), "I've Got You Under My Skin" (1936), "Easy to Love" (1936), and "Isle of Capri" (1934).

Noble and his orchestra appeared in the 1937 film A Damsel in Distress with Fred Astaire, Joan Fontaine, George Burns and Gracie Allen. Noble played a somewhat "dense" character who was in love with Gracie Allen. Bowlly returned to England in January 1937, but Noble continued to lead bands in America, moving into an acting career, often portraying a stereotypical upper-class English character.

Noble played the piano, but seldom did so with his orchestra. In a movie short from the 1940s featuring Ray Noble and Buddy Clark (one of his most popular band singers), Noble is asked by the announcer to play one of his most popular hits. He sits down at the piano and plays "Goodnight, Sweetheart".

Noble provided music for many radio shows such as The Chase and Sanborn Hour, The Charlie McCarthy Show, Burns and Allen and On Stage with Cathy and Elliott Lewis and also guest-appeared in some of their films. He worked with Bergen for nearly fifteen years, playing the foil to McCarthy and the slow-witted Mortimer Snerd, and his orchestra appeared with Edgar Bergen in the 1942 film Here We Go Again. He also provided the orchestration for the 1942 Lou Gehrig biopic The Pride of the Yankees starring Gary Cooper. Noble's last major successes as a bandleader came with Buddy Clark in the late 1940s.

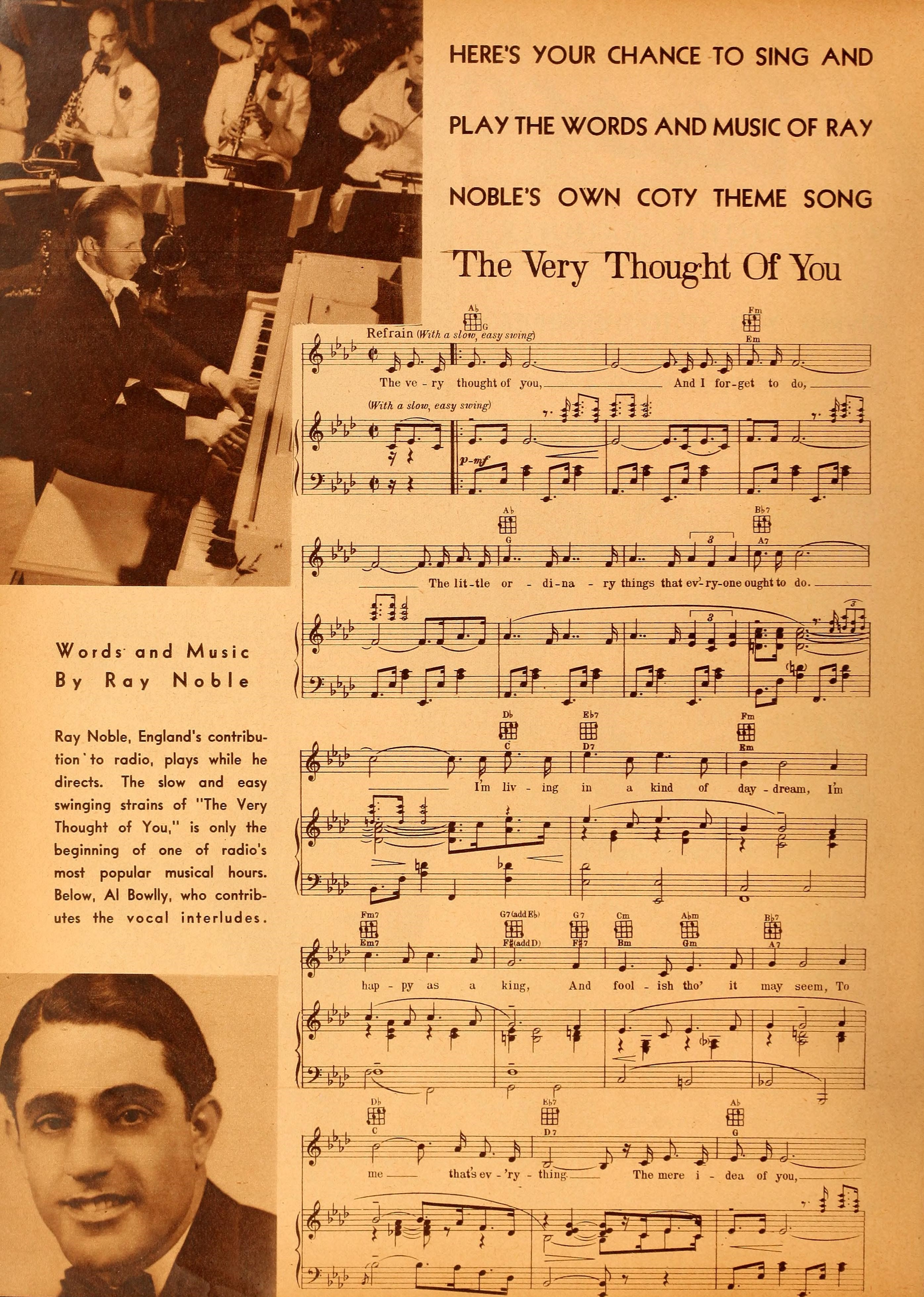
The Very Thought of You sheet music

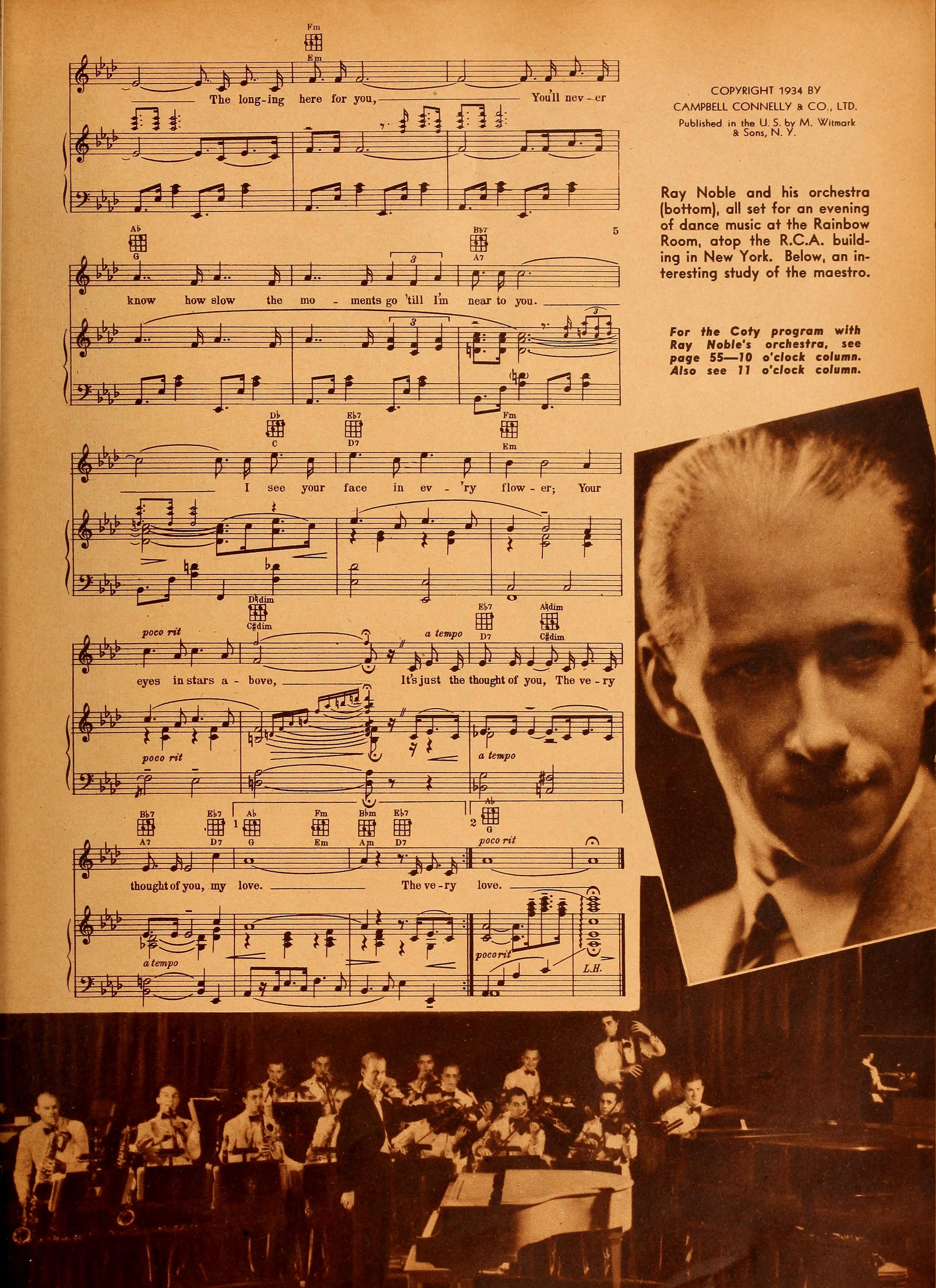

== Retirement ==
Edgar Bergen's ventriloquist TV show ended in the mid-1950s, and Noble retired to Santa Barbara, California. In the late 1960s, Noble relocated to Jersey in the Channel Islands. In March 1978, he flew to London for treatment of cancer, and later died of the disease at a London hospital.

Specialist dance band radio stations continue to play his records. Noble has also featured regularly on the Manx Radio programme Sweet & Swing, presented by Howard Caine.

== Posthumous honours ==
- In 1987 Noble was inducted into the Big Band and Jazz Hall of Fame.
- In 1996 Noble was inducted into the Songwriters Hall of Fame.
- In 2005 "The Very Thought of You", recorded by Ray Noble and His Orchestra on Victor in 1934, received the Grammy Hall of Fame Award

== In popular culture ==
- In 1938 the Noble compositions "The Very Thought of You", and "You're So Desirable" were recorded by Billie Holiday and Teddy Wilson.
- The Noble and Bowlly 1934 recordings of "Midnight, the Stars and You" and "It's All Forgotten Now" were prominently featured on the soundtrack of Stanley Kubrick's 1980 film The Shining.
- In 1990 the Noble composition "You're So Desirable" was recorded by Robert Palmer.
- In John Le Carré's 1989 book, The Russia House and the 1990 film version, protagonist "Barley" Blair, played by Sean Connery in the film, is portrayed as having once played in the "great Ray Noble's Band"
- Many of television and film playwright Dennis Potter's later works feature characters lip-synching to Noble recordings.
