= Lew Stone =

British bandleader and arranger (1898–1969)

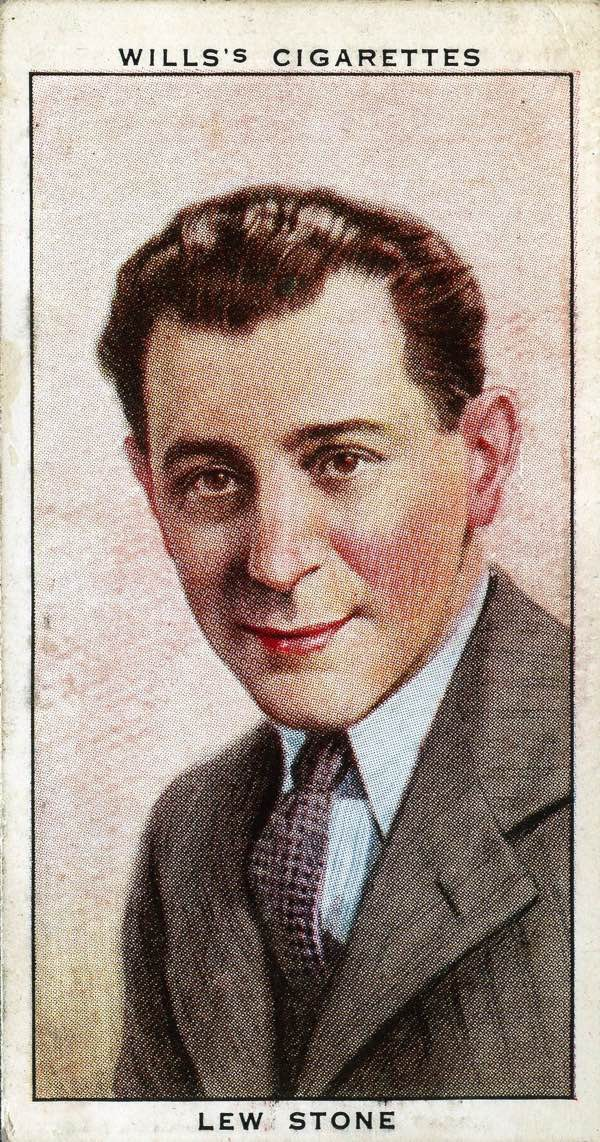
- Lew Stone, c. 1934

Background information
- Born: Louis Steinberg; 28 May 1898; London, England
- Died: 13 February 1969 (aged 70) Roehampton, London, England
- Genre: British dance band
- Occupation: Bandleader
- Instrument: Piano
- Years active: 1925–1969
- Labels: Decca, Regal Zonophone

Lew Stone (born Louis Steinberg; 28 May 1898 – 13 February 1969) was a British bandleader and arranger of the British dance band era. He was well known in Britain during the 1930s and was known as a skillful, innovative and imaginative musical arranger.

== Early life and career ==
Stone was born Louis Steinberg in Bethnal Green, son of Hyman Steinberg, a cabinetmaker, and wife Kate. Stone showed promise in both music and football, playing for the Corinthian F.C. and Casuals F.C. teams in the daytime and playing as a pianist in the evening. In the 1920s, he worked with many important dance bands. Some arrangements attributed to Stone can be heard on particular records by the Savoy Orpheans (1927) and Ray Starita and his Ambassador's Band (1928).

During 1927–1931, Stone's arrangements for the Bert Ambrose Orchestra made it in Europe. Stone continued to work with other bands like Jack Hylton's and Jack Payne's BBC Dance Orchestra, and he also took several top musicians into the studio to make a few recordings that were issued on the Duophone label as 'Lewis Stone and his Orchestra'.

== 1930s ==
Roy Fox's Band opened at the Monseigneur Restaurant in 1931 and Stone took up the position of pianist and arranger. When Fox became ill in October he was sent to Switzerland to rest and Stone assumed leadership of the band. The main vocalist at the Monseigneur was Al Bowlly, who had already sung on over 30 recordings. When Fox returned to London in April 1932, he found that his band was the most popular in the city. A contemporary article in The Gramophone magazine described events.

In 1932, Stone also worked with a studio band and several recordings were issued on the flexible Durium Records featuring vocals by Al Bowlly, Sam Browne and Les Allen. Some of the arrangements on Durium were by Stan Bowsher. In October 1932, when Roy Fox's contract at the Monseigneur ended, Stone accepted the post of bandleader. Rave reviews were common in the music press: for example, Melody Maker. The popularity of vocalist Al Bowlly increased; he was a regular on broadcasts, his name was credited on many of the Decca records and he toured with the band, including an appearance before of royalty at the London Palladium.

In 1933, Stone's Monseigneur Band was involved in a competition designed to test the popularity in Britain of British vs US dance bands. It was run by the News Chronicle newspaper and was based on the sales of specially recorded dance tunes by Stone's band, Jack Hylton's, Guy Lombardo's and Wayne King's. The songs were "What More can I Ask?" and "Can't We Meet Again?".

From late 1931 until 1934, Stone was also musical director for British & Dominions Film Corporation, working mostly from Elstree Studios, and later worked with other film companies. About 40 pre-1947 films which involved Stone with his band or as musical director are included in the listings of British musical films on the British Dance Bands on Film, British Entertainers on Film, British Musical Directors website.

In November 1933, Stone transferred his band to the Cafe Anglais and in February 1934 started a successful tour for the Mecca Agency. The band returned to the Monseigneur in March 1934 until the summer when the Monseigneur was sold to become a cinema. In September 1934, Al Bowlly and Bill Harty left to join Ray Noble in U.S. For about a year from November 1934, Stone moved to the Regal Zonophone record label, continued with theatre tours, and the band was resident for a time at the Hollywood Restaurant. Alan Kane became the main vocalist while there were also vocal contributions from band members Nat Gonella, Joe Ferrie, Tiny Winters, Joe Crossman, and American composer Al Hoffman. When Gonella left to concentrate on his own Georgians band in March 1935, trumpeter Tommy McQuater joined Stone's band. On 12 October, Stone featured Sam Browne as vocalist for the first time with "Cheek To Cheek" and "Isn't This A Lovely Day?". In November, Stone and his band returned to the Decca record label. In 1936, Stone stopped touring and formed a smaller band which opened on 30 March at the Café de Paris. The band also began to broadcast regularly for commercial radio stations Radio Normandy and Radio Luxembourg. In October, Stone became musical director for the show On Your Toes (opened February 1937). The band continued at the Cafe de Paris until 31 July 1937. In September, Stone became musical director of the show Hide and Seek at the London Hippodrome, starring Cicely Courtneidge and Bobby Howes.

Al Bowlly returned to England at the end of 1937, and in February 1938 he began recording with Stone again. Stone's band played music in a wide variety of dance tempos and genres while working with Bowlly. Today, their collaborative music is often sampled by modern artists, notably titles featuring Bowlly.

Stone was innovative and willing to work with modern music. His recordings of the Gene Gifford/Casa Loma Orchestra titles were careful interpretations that made full use of the musicians in his band. In particular, the skills of Lew Davis, Joe Crossman and Nat Gonella were recognized on several of Stone's earlier jazz titles, some of which were issued in U.S.

In June 1938, the band was the first name band to play at Butlins Holiday Camps, and in September they were back at The Cafe de Paris and broadcasting regularly from there. In October, Stone became musical director for the Jack Hulbert show Under Your Hat which continued into 1939, and featured the Rhythm Brothers (Clive Erard, Jack Trafford, Frank Trafford). His band played at the El Morocco Club, London.

== 1940s and 1950s ==
In June 1940, Stone opened at the Dorchester Hotel with a seven-piece band which he led on the novachord. This band was much praised for its original style. Later, Stone also made several records with his jazz group, the Stonecrackers, which featured Britain's finest soloists. Broadcasting and recording with his large band continued, and he toured the country during the rest of the war years.

After the war, his band resided at various places including The Embassy Club, The Pigalle Restaurant and Oddenino's Restaurant up to 1955. In this period, he made several recordings with the King of Jiddish Music, Leo Fuld. Stone continued to work round the ballrooms and broadcast with his fourteen-piece band until 1959, when the BBC told him that he could not expect to broadcast as frequently as he would wish unless he reduced the size of his band. Thus Lew Stone and his sextet was born.

== 1960s ==
For the next eight years, Stone's sextet played frequently for Music While You Work, also appearing weekly for nearly two years in a breakfast-time programme, The Bands Played On. Stone primarily concentrated on his entertainments agency in the 1960s.

== Personal life and death ==
In 1937, Stone married Ethel Joyce Newman at Marylebone Register Office. She was a pianist, whom he had met in 1933. The couple had no children, and she survived him.

Stone died on 13 February 1969, aged 70.

== Selected filmography ==
- Thark (1932)
- A Night Like This (1932)
- Say It with Music (1932)
- Leap Year (1932)
- Bitter Sweet (1933)
- The King's Cup (1933)
- It's a King (1933)
- Discord (1933)
- Night of the Garter (1933)
- Up for the Derby (1933)
- Up to the Neck (1933)
- Intimate Relations (1937)
- Under Your Hat (1940)

== Bibliography ==
- Gammond, Peter. "Stone, Lewis". Oxford Dictionary of National Biography (online ed.). Oxford University Press. doi:10.1093/ref:odnb/66492. (Subscription, Wikipedia Library access or UK public library membership required.)
- Ades, David; Bickerdyke, Percy; Holmes, Eric (1999). This England's Book of British Dance Bands. Cheltenham: This England Books. ISBN 0-906324-25-4.
