= Al Bowlly =

South African–British vocalist (1899–1941)

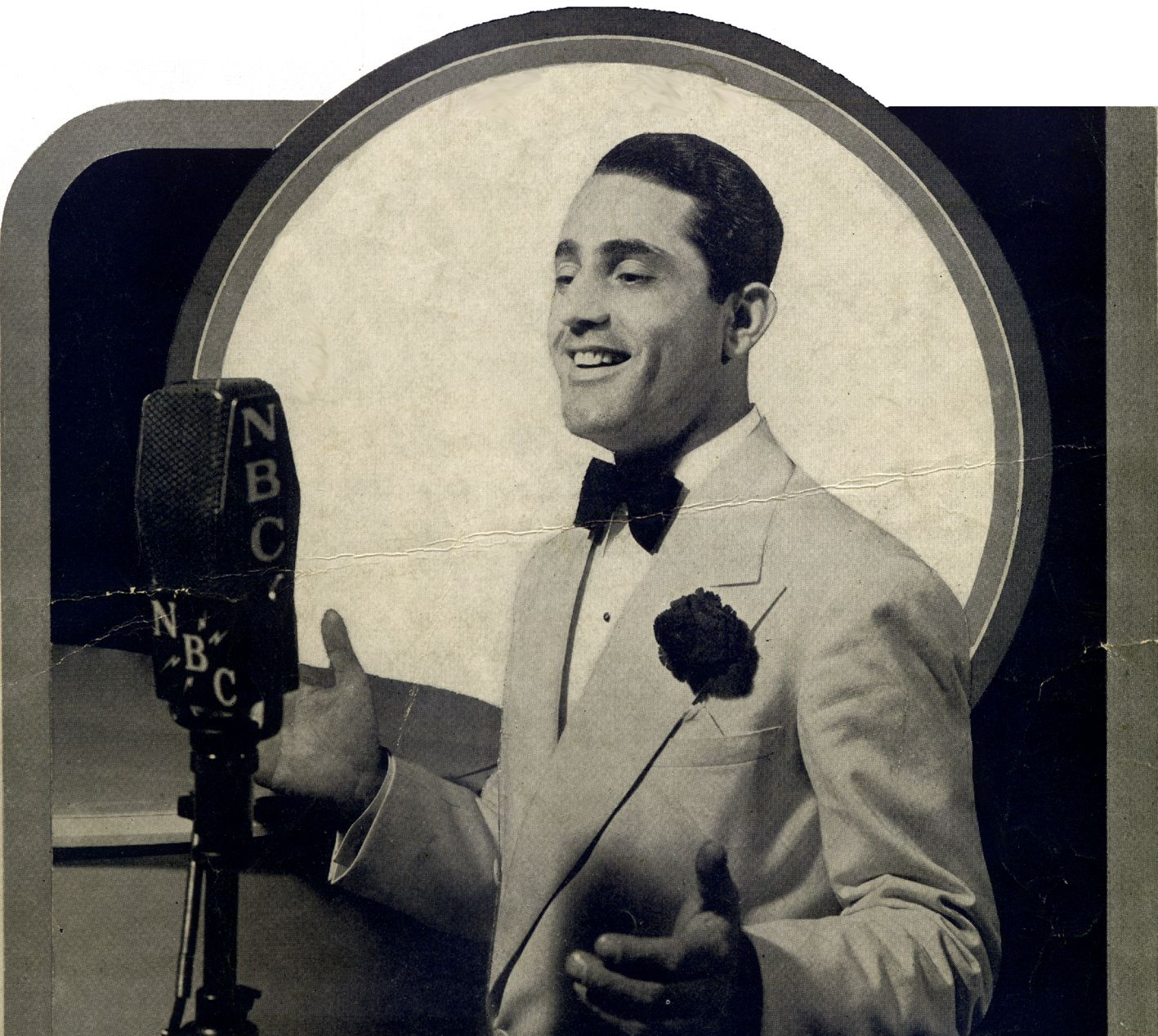
- Bowlly on sheet music cover for "Every Minute of the Hour" (1936)

Background information
- Born: Albert Allick Bowlly; 7 January 1899; Lourenço Marques, Portuguese Mozambique
- Died: 17 April 1941 (aged 42) London, England
- Genres: Jazz, British dance band, big band
- Occupations: Singer, guitarist
- Years active: 1926-1941

Albert Allick Bowlly (7 January 1899 – 17 April 1941) was a British vocalist, crooner, and dance band guitarist who was Britain's most popular singer for most of the 1930s. He recorded upwards of 1,000 songs that were listened to by millions in Britain and other English speaking countries, seeing further success in the United States.

His most popular songs include "Midnight, the Stars and You", "Blue Moon", "Goodnight, Sweetheart", "Close Your Eyes", "The Very Thought of You", "Guilty", "Heartaches" and "Love Is the Sweetest Thing". He also recorded the only English version of "Dark Eyes" by Adalgiso Ferraris, as "Black Eyes", with lyrics by Albert Mellor.

== Early life ==
He was born in 1899 in Lourenço Marques (today Maputo) in the Portuguese colony of Mozambique. His father, Alick, was a Greek Orthodox Christian from the island of Rhodes. His mother, Miriam Ayoub-NeeJame, was a Lebanese Catholic, though Bowlly was raised Greek Orthodox. They met en route to Australia and moved to British South Africa. Bowlly was brought up in Johannesburg. The family's original surname was Pauli, which was misspelt as Bowlly; Alick was only able to speak and read Greek, so the mistake went unnoticed and the name became permanent.

== Career ==
After a series of odd jobs in Colesberg, South Africa, including barber and jockey, he sang in a dance band led by Edgar Adeler on a tour of South Africa, Rhodesia, India and the Dutch East Indies during the early to mid-1920s. His main role was as guitarist. He was fired from the band in Soerabaja, Dutch East Indies.

Jimmy Lequime hired Bowlly to sing with his band in India and Singapore at Raffles Hotel. When he left Lequime, it was with the pianist Monia Liter, the two of them travelling to Germany, where they played with Arthur Briggs and his Savoy Syncopators, Fred Bird's Salon Symphonic Jazz Band, and George Carhart's New Yorkers Jazz Orchestra. In 1927 Bowlly made his first record, a cover version of "Blue Skies" by Irving Berlin that was recorded with Adeler in Berlin, Germany. During the next year, Bowlly worked in London, with the orchestra of Fred Elizalde.

Bowlly moved to Britain, where in July 1928 he joined Fred Elizalde's band at the Savoy Hotel, London until 1929. He went on to play with various bands on a temporary basis, before gaining more regular employment in May 1931 with Roy Fox, singing in his live band for the Monseigneur Restaurant, a stylish restaurant on Piccadilly in London, and with bandleader Ray Noble in November 1930.

During the next four years, he recorded over 500 songs. By 1933, Lew Stone had ousted Fox as the Monseigneur's bandleader and Bowlly was singing Stone's arrangements with Stone's band. After much radio exposure and a successful British tour with Stone, Bowlly was now Britain's top singer, and was inundated with demands for appearances and gigs – including undertaking a solo British tour – but continued to make most of his recordings with Noble. There was considerable competition between Noble and Stone for Bowlly's time. For much of the year, Bowlly spent the day in the recording studio with Noble's band, rehearsing and recording, then the evening with Stone's band at the Monseigneur. Many of these recordings with Noble were issued in the United States by Victor, which meant that by the time Noble and Bowlly came to America, their reputation had preceded them.

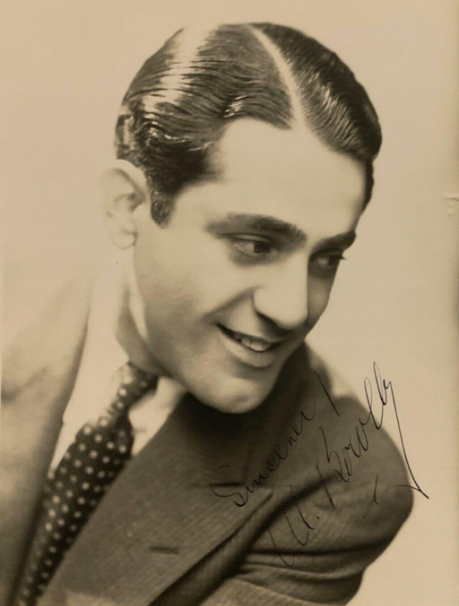
Bowlly in the United States

Once Bowlly and Noble arrived in the States in Autumn of 1934, Noble assembled a new orchestra, which included notable artists such as Charlie Spivak, Glenn Miller, Bud Freeman, and Pee Wee Erwin. Noble's Orchestra was resident in the Rainbow Room atop the Rockefeller Center in New York. Noble and Bowlly would broadcast over NBC and CBS, causing Ray Noble's Orchestra to be one of the most popular dance orchestras in the United States. Bowlly was also riding high in the States; he had his own NBC radio series, a magazine that featured the latest news and press interviews about Bowlly, his picture was on sheet music, and he even beat Bing Crosby in a nationwide popularity poll in 1936.

Bowlly's absence from the UK in the mid-1930s damaged his popularity with British audiences, and his career began to suffer as a result of problems with his voice, which affected the frequency of his recordings. He played a few small parts in films, but the parts were often cut and scenes that were shown were brief. Noble was offered a role in Hollywood, although the offer excluded Bowlly because a singer had already been hired. Bowlly moved back to London with his wife Marjie in January 1937.

He performed in England with his band, the Radio City Rhythm Makers. However, by early 1937, the band had broken up when vocal problems were traced to a wart in his throat, briefly causing him to lose his voice. Separated from his wife and with his band dissolved, he traveled to New York City for corrective surgery.

With diminished success in Britain, he toured regional theatres and recorded as often as possible to make a living, moving from orchestra to orchestra, working with people like Sydney Lipton, Geraldo, and Ken "Snakehips" Johnson. Al Bowlly also started to make his own solo records and would broadcast over several popular radio stations such as Radio Luxembourg and the BBC, which helped him regain a large amount of popularity, although many claim he did not enjoy as much success as he did in his earlier days before he moved to the United States. One of his songs, "It's Time to Say Goodnight", was used as Radio Luxembourg's closing song until it temporarily shut down during World War II (a cover by Connie Francis would be used as the station's ending song during the early 1960s). In 1940, there was a revival of interest in his career when he worked in a duo with Jimmy Mesene in Radio Stars with Two Guitars on the London stage. It was his last venture before his death in April 1941. The partnership was uneasy; Mesene was an alcoholic and he was occasionally unable to perform. Bowlly recorded his last song two weeks before his death. It was a duet with Mesene of Irving Berlin's satirical song about Hitler, "When That Man is Dead and Gone".

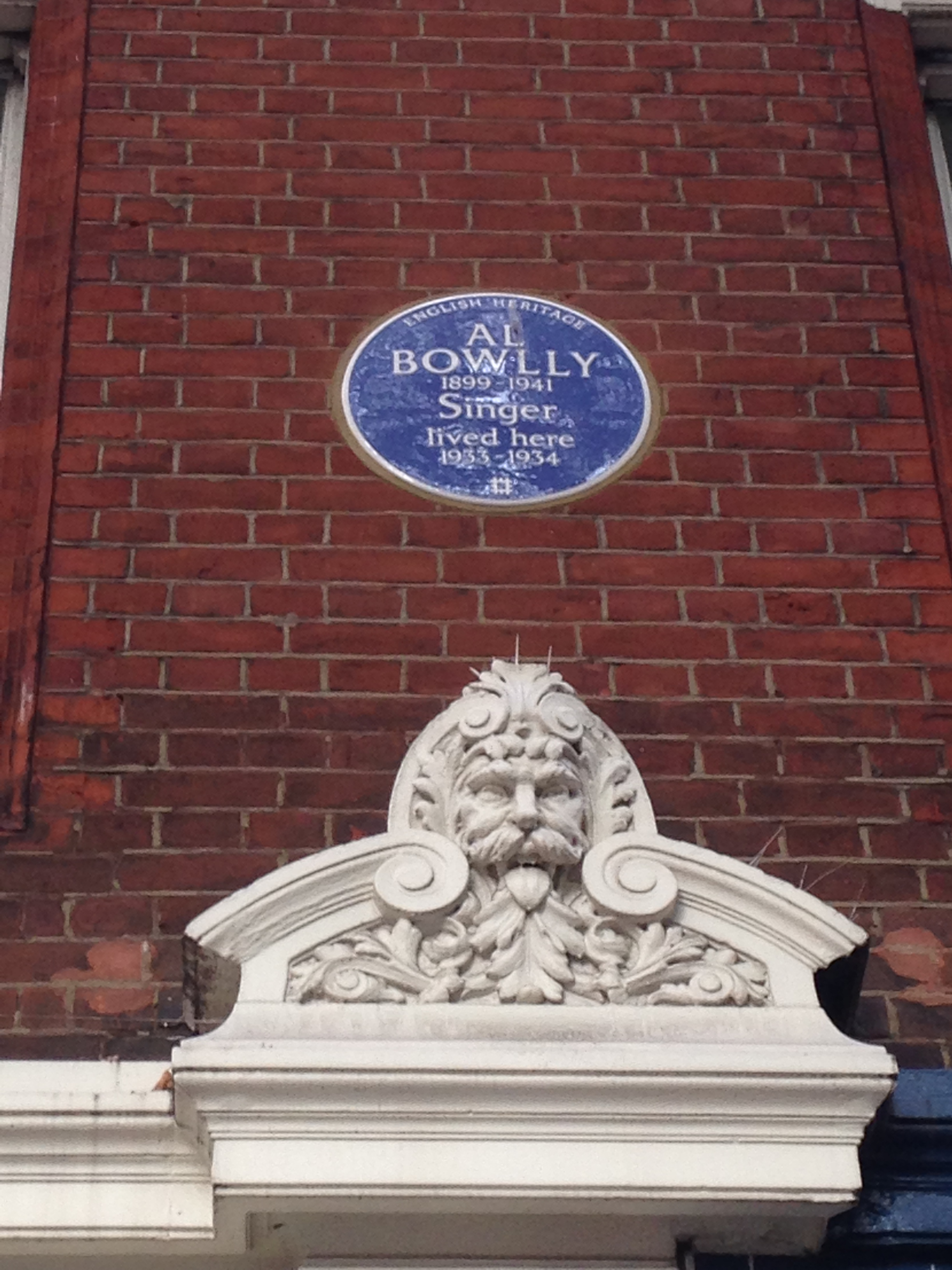
An English Heritage plaque stating "Al Bowlly lived here", located at 26 Charing Cross Road in London, England

== Personal life and death ==
In December 1931, Bowlly married Constance Freda Roberts (officially divorced in 1934) in St Martin's Register Office, London; the couple separated after a fortnight and sought a divorce. He remarried in December 1934 to Marjie Fairless. This marriage lasted until his death; although they split up in 1937, they never officially divorced.

On 16 April 1941, Bowlly and Mesene had given a performance at the Rex Cinema in Oxford Street, High Wycombe. Both were offered an overnight stay in town, but Bowlly took the last train home to his flat at 32 Duke Street, Duke's Court, St James, London. He was killed by a Luftwaffe parachute mine that detonated outside his flat at 3:10 a.m. His body appeared unmarked. Although the explosion had not disfigured him, it had blown his bedroom door off its hinges, and the impact against his head was fatal. He was buried with other bombing victims in a mass grave at Hanwell Cemetery, Uxbridge Road, Hanwell, where his name is given as Albert Alex Bowlly.

A blue plaque commemorating Bowlly was installed in November 2013 by English Heritage at Charing Cross Mansion, 26 Charing Cross Road, described as "his home at the pinnacle of his career".

== Legacy ==
Bowlly's cover songs have been widely included in other forms of media. The Caretaker, who sampled Bowlly's music for his Everywhere at the End of Time series of albums from 2016 to 2019, has said the public believed that if Bowlly had not died during the war, he would have been "bigger than Bing Crosby," and that "he had a better voice."

Dennis Potter's television play Moonlight on the Highway, first broadcast in the UK on 12 April 1969, focused on a young Al Bowlly fanatic attempting to blot out memories of sexual abuse via his fixation with the singer. Potter later featured Bowlly's music in Pennies from Heaven (1978).

Bowlly was mentioned, and his songs were used, throughout the first few series of the British TV comedy Goodnight Sweetheart.

Bowlly's rendition of "Midnight, the Stars and You" has been particularly used and referenced throughout varied films, appearing in The Shining, Toy Story 4, and Ready Player One. Some commentators specifically highlight its use in The Shining's ending scene, with HeadStuff's Luka Vukos calling it "haunting" and Screen Rant praising it as "one of the most unforgettable final shots in film history." The song has also been used in the 2013 video game BioShock Infinite: Burial at Sea and sampled by musician Leyland Kirby on the Caretaker's Shining-inspired album Selected Memories from the Haunted Ballroom. Bowlly's "It's All Forgotten Now" was also featured in The Shining ballroom scene.

Bowlly's 1931 recording of "Hang Out the Stars in Indiana" with Ray Noble & The New Mayfair Dance Orchestra, featured in Bruce Robinson's 1987 British comedy film, Withnail and I.

Richard Thompson wrote a song titled "Al Bowlly's In Heaven", sung from the perspective of a homeless British Second World War veteran reminiscing of his times as a soldier and the pleasures of Bowlly's music, drawing a contrast with his difficulties in adjusting to postwar life afterward. The song was included on Thompson's 1985 album Daring Adventures. The song has been a staple of his live set ever since and is included on many of his live releases.

A sample of "My Woman", recorded by Bowlly with Lew Stone in November 1932, appeared on White Town's UK chart topper "Your Woman" (1997).

Bowlly's rendition of the song "Guilty" was used in the Jean-Pierre Jeunet film Amélie (2001).

Bowlly's work particularly lives on in the Everywhere at the End of Time community, where several fan albums, such as The Overlook's Colorado Lounge Section, feature many songs by Bowlly. The analog horror community also uses many of Bowlly's songs, such as The Walten Files and Battington's Harmony and Horror series.

== Partial discography ==
Song	Year
"Soho Blues"	1926
"Blue Skies"	1927
"Muddy Water"	1927
"Are You Happy?"	1927
"If I Had You"	1928
"Misery Farm"	1928
"Singapore Sorrows"	1929
"Dancing With Tears in My Eyes"	1930
"I'm Telling the World She's Mine"	1930
"Time on My Hands"	1931
"Goodnight, Sweetheart"	1931
"Really Mine"	1931
"Heartaches"	1931
"Guilty"	1931
"Hang Out the Stars in Indiana"	1931
"By the Fireside"	1932
"If Anything Happened to You"	1932
"Lullaby of the Leaves"	1932
"Looking on the Bright Side of Life"	1932
"Love Is The Sweetest Thing"	1932
"My Woman"	1932
"What More Can I Ask?"	1932
"Hustlin' and Bustlin' for Baby"	1933
"If You'll Say 'Yes' Cherie"	1933
"Isn't it Heavenly?"	1933
"Brother, Can You Spare a Dime?"	1933
"Close Your Eyes"	1933
"Midnight, the Stars and You"	1934
"True"	1934
"The Very Thought of You"	1934
"I Love You Truly"	1934
"Easy Come, Easy Go"	1934
"It's All Forgotten Now"	1934
"Isle of Capri"	1934
"Be Still My Heart!"	1934
"Blue Moon"	1935
"My Melancholy Baby"	1935
"Roll Along, Prairie Moon"	1935
"Dinner for One Please, James"	1935
"The Touch of Your Lips"	1936
"There's Something in the Air"	1936
"I've Got You Under My Skin"	1936
"Smile When You Say Goodbye"	1937
"I Can Dream, Can't I?"	1937
"I Double Dare You"	1938
"Moonlight on the Highway"	1938
"You Couldn't Be Cuter"	1938
"Penny Serenade"	1938
"Jeepers Creepers"	1939
"I'm Madly in Love with You"	1939
"A Man and His Dream"	1939
"It's a Lovely Day Tomorrow"	1940
"Dreaming"	1940
"When That Man is Dead and Gone"	1941
