= Vera Lynn 100 =

Compilation album by Vera Lynn
- Released: 17 March 2017
- Recorded: 2016–17
- Genre: Traditional pop
- Length: 38 min. approx
- Label: Decca
- Producer: James Morgan, Juliette Pochin

Vera Lynn chronology
Her Greatest from Abbey Road (2017)	Vera Lynn 100 (2017)

Vera Lynn 100 is a compilation album by English singer Vera Lynn. The album was released on 17 March 2017, by Decca Records, produced by James Morgan and Juliette Pochin to celebrate Lynn's 100th birthday. Some of her best-known songs were re-orchestrated for the album, which features original vocals. The LP features a previously recorded and hitherto unreleased cover of the Gavin Sutherland-composed "Sailing", and collaborations with singers Alfie Boe, Alexander Armstrong, Aled Jones and Cynthia Erivo.

== Commercial performance ==
The album debuted on the UK Albums Chart at No. 3. As a result of this, Lynn became the oldest living person and first ever centenarian to have an album charting (as she had turned 100 four days prior to the album's release). She supplanted her own previous record set in June 2014 when, at 97, she was the oldest living artist to make the top 20, with National Treasure. The album was blocked from the top spot by Ed Sheeran's ÷ (the album's third week at the top) and Drake's More Life. Following the 75th Anniversary of VE Day the album re-entered the UK album chart at number 30, again breaking her own record for the oldest person to chart.

== Track listing ==
No.	Title	Writer(s)	Length
1.	"We'll Meet Again" (featuring Alfie Boe)	Ross Parker; Hughie Charles	3:31
2.	"Sailing"	Gavin Sutherland	3:04
3.	"(There'll Be Bluebirds Over) The White Cliffs of Dover" (featuring Alexander Armstrong)	Walter Kent; Nat Burton	3:20
4.	"Wish Me Luck as You Wave Me Goodbye"	Harry Parr-Davies	3:28
5.	"As Time Goes By" (featuring Aled Jones)	Herman Hupfeld	3:09
6.	"Auf Wiederseh'n Sweetheart"	John Turner; Geoffrey Parsons	2:40
7.	"The Loveliest Night of the Year"	Juventino Rosas; Irving Aaronson; Paul Francis Webster	2:32
8.	"When You Wish upon a Star" (featuring Cynthia Erivo)	Leigh Harline; Ned Washington	2:32
9.	"A Nightingale Sang in Berkeley Square" (featuring the Ayoub Sisters)	Eric Maschwitz; Manning Sherwin	3:29
10.	"I'm Forever Blowing Bubbles"	John Kellette	3:32
11.	"Close to You"	Al Hoffman; Carl Lampl; Jerry Livingston	3:40
12.	"Yours" (featuring the Squadronaires)	Gonzalo Roig; Augustin Rodriguez	3:18

== Charts ==
=== Weekly charts ===
Chart (2017)	Peak position
Australian Albums (ARIA)	29
Belgian Albums (Ultratop Flanders)	38
Dutch Albums (Album Top 100)	72
Irish Albums (IRMA)	61
New Zealand Albums (RMNZ)	7
Scottish Albums (OCC)	2
UK Albums (OCC)	3

=== Year-end charts ===
Chart (2017)	Position
UK Albums (OCC)	56

== Awards and nominations ==
Year	Association	Category	Result
2018	Classic Brit Awards	Album of the Year	Nominated
2018	Classic Brit Awards	Female Vocalist of the Year	Nominated
2018	Classic Brit Awards	Lifetime Achievement Award	Won
