= Her Greatest from Abbey Road =

Compilation album by Vera Lynn
- Released: 10 March 2017
- Recorded: 1962–1974 at Abbey Road Studios, London
- Genre: Pop, adult contemporary
- Label: Parlophone (Warner Music Group)
- Producer: Norman Newell, Harry Lewis, David R. Gooch, Stephen James, Walter J. Ridley

Vera Lynn chronology
National Treasure – Ultimate Collection (2014)	Her Greatest from Abbey Road (2017)	Vera Lynn 100 (2017)

Her Greatest from Abbey Road is a 2017 compilation album by English singer Vera Lynn. Released on 10 March to mark her 100th birthday, the album, produced by Parlophone and Warner Music UK, compiles Lynn's recordings from Abbey Road Studios for the first time.

== Overview ==
The album features recordings from Abbey Road Studios of some of Lynn's biggest chart hits, such as "We'll Meet Again" and "The White Cliffs of Dover" alongside other standards that originate from her A- and B-side singles and original studio albums released between 1962 and 1974. Five previously unreleased recordings from Lynn are included, such as a new version of her No. 1 UK hit "My Son, My Son". The album contains two bonus tracks (tracks 22 and 23), which are unreleased songs from recording sessions made at Chappell Road Studios. Lynn selected photographs and contributed a message for the release. Also featured is a personal tribute from Sir Tim Rice.

Elaine Paige premiered the unreleased song "Where or When" on her BBC Radio 2 show Elaine Paige on Sunday on 5 March 2017.

== Track listing ==
1. "My Son, My Son" [previously unreleased]
2. "Mr. Wonderful"
3. "I'm Beginning to See the Light"
4. "The White Cliffs of Dover"
5. "Medley: When The Lights Go On Again/I'll Pray for You/We'll Meet Again"
6. "It's a Sin to Tell a Lie" [previously unreleased]
7. "No Regrets" [previously unreleased]
8. "There'll Always Be an England"
9. "Land of Hope and Glory"
10. "It Hurts to Say Goodbye"
11. "Yours"
12. "I'll Be Seeing You"
13. "Lili Marlene"
14. "You'll Never Know"
15. "Stars Fell on Alabama"
16. "Autumn Leaves"
17. "Where Have All the Flowers Gone?"
18. "Good Night"
19. "As Time Goes By"
20. "I Wish You Love"
21. "A Nightingale Sang in Berkeley Square"
22. "The Nearness of You" (Ted Carfrae Mix) [previously unreleased]
23. "Where or When" (Ted Carfrae Mix) [previously unreleased]

== Charts ==
Chart (2017)	Peak position
Irish Albums (IRMA)	76
Scottish Albums (OCC)	37
UK Albums (OCC)	45
