= We'll Meet Again (disambiguation) =

"We'll Meet Again" is a 1939 song made famous by Vera Lynn.

We'll Meet Again may also refer to:

== Film and television ==
- We'll Meet Again (1943 film), a musical starring Lynn
- We'll Meet Again, a 1999 story by Mary Higgins Clark
  - We'll Meet Again (2002 film), a film based on the story
- We'll Meet Again (TV series), a 1982 British television series
- We'll Meet Again with Ann Curry, a 2017–18 PBS television series
- "We'll Meet Again" (True Blood), an episode of True Blood

== Music ==
- We'll Meet Again: The Very Best of Vera Lynn, a 2009 compilation album
- We Will Meet Again, an album by Bill Evans
- "We'll Meet Again", a song by Pantera from Power Metal
- "We'll Meet Again", a song by TheFatRat

== See also ==
- Till We Meet Again (disambiguation)
