= We'll Meet Again: The Very Best of Vera Lynn =

We'll Meet Again: The Very Best Of Vera Lynn

Compilation album by Vera Lynn
- Released: 25 August 2009
- Recorded: 1936–1959
- Genre: Traditional pop
- Length: 58:19
- Label: Decca
- Producer: Various

Vera Lynn chronology
We'll Meet Again (1989)	We'll Meet Again: The Very Best Of Vera Lynn (2009)	Unforgettable (2010)

We'll Meet Again: The Very Best of Vera Lynn is a compilation album by English singer Vera Lynn.

The album is a selection of her recordings made for Decca Records, for whom Lynn recorded between 1936 and 1959. It reached number one on the UK Albums Chart on 13 September 2009, making her at age 92 the oldest living artist to achieve this feat with an album. The album entered the chart at number 20 on 30 August, and then climbed to number 2 the following week, before reaching the top position.

== Track listing ==
No.	Title	Writer(s)	Length
1.	"(There'll Be Bluebirds Over) The White Cliffs of Dover"	Walter Kent, Nat Burton	3:18
2.	"Auf Wiederseh'n Sweetheart"	Eberhard Storch, John Turner, Geoffrey Parsons	2:36
3.	"We'll Meet Again"	Ross Parker, Hughie Charles	3:01
4.	"Travellin' Home"	Traditional: arrangement Dix, Masters	3:06
5.	"As Time Goes By"	Herman Hupfeld	3:00
6.	"Dream"	Johnny Mercer	2:41
7.	"Far Away Places"	Joan Whitney, Alex Kramer	2:41
8.	"Harbour Lights"	Will Grosz, Jimmy Kennedy	3:07
9.	"It's a Lovely Day Tomorrow"	Irving Berlin	3:13
10.	"If You Love Me (Really Love Me)"	Edith Piaf, Marguerite Monnot, Geoffrey Parsons	2:59
11.	"When You Hear Big Ben"	Harry Leon, Mark Malloy, Jack Scott	2:31
12.	"Yours"	Gonzalo Roig, Albert Gamse, Jack Sherr	3:11
13.	"The Loveliest Night of the Year"	Juventino Rosas, Irving Aaronson, Paul Francis Webster	1:12
14.	"Wish Me Luck as You Wave Me Goodbye"	Harry Parr-Davies	3:15
15.	"Half as Much" / "Isle of Innisfree" / "You Belong to Me"	Williams / Farrelly / King, Stewart, Price	3:04
16.	"Up the Wooden Hill to Bedfordshire"	Grey, Connelly	3:05
17.	"When I Grow Too Old to Dream"	Sigmund Romberg, Oscar Hammerstein II	2:45
18.	"Somewhere Along the Way" / "Here in My Heart" / "Let the Rest of the World Go By"	Adams, Gallop / Bonnelli, Levinson, Genaro / Ball, Brennan	3:31
19.	"I'm Forever Blowing Bubbles"	James Kendis, James Brockman, Nat Vincent	3:29
20.	"From the Time You Say Goodbye (The Parting Song)"	Leslie Sturdy	2:27

== Performance ==
Vocals - Vera Lynn;

- with Mantovani & His Orchestra (Track 1)
- with Sailors, Soldiers & Airmen of Her Majesty's Forces (Tracks 2, 3, 7, 20)
- with Roland Shaw & His Orchestra (Tracks 7, 12, 15)
- with Woolf Phillips And His Orchestra (Track 13)
- with Charles Smart (Track 16)
- with The Clubmen (Track 17)
- with Eric Rogers and his Orchestra (Track 19)

== Charts ==
=== Weekly charts ===
Chart (2009)	Peak position
Australian Albums (ARIA)	21
Belgian Albums (Ultratop Flanders)	10
Danish Albums (Hitlisten)	28
Dutch Albums (Album Top 100)	83
Irish Albums (IRMA)	48
New Zealand Albums (RMNZ)	8
Norwegian Albums (VG-lista)	18
Scottish Albums (OCC)	2
UK Albums (OCC)	1

=== Year-end charts ===
Chart (2009)	Position
Belgian Albums (Ultratop Flanders)	59
UK Albums (OCC)	36

== Certifications ==
Region	Certification	Certified units/sales
New Zealand (RMNZ)	Platinum	15,000^{^}
United Kingdom (BPI)	Platinum	300,000^{^}
^{^} Shipments figures based on certification alone.
