= Kolby (surname) =

Kolby is a surname. Notable people with the surname include:

- Kristian Kolby (born 1978), Danish racing driver
- Marit Kolby (born 1975), Norwegian nutritional biologist, university lecturer and author
- Ole Peter Kolby (born 1939), Norwegian diplomat
- Ross Kolby (born 1970), Norwegian visual artist and author

== See also ==
- Colby (surname)
- Kolby (given name)
