= Vera Lynn =

English singer and entertainer (1917–2020)

Dame Vera Lynn CH DBE OStJ
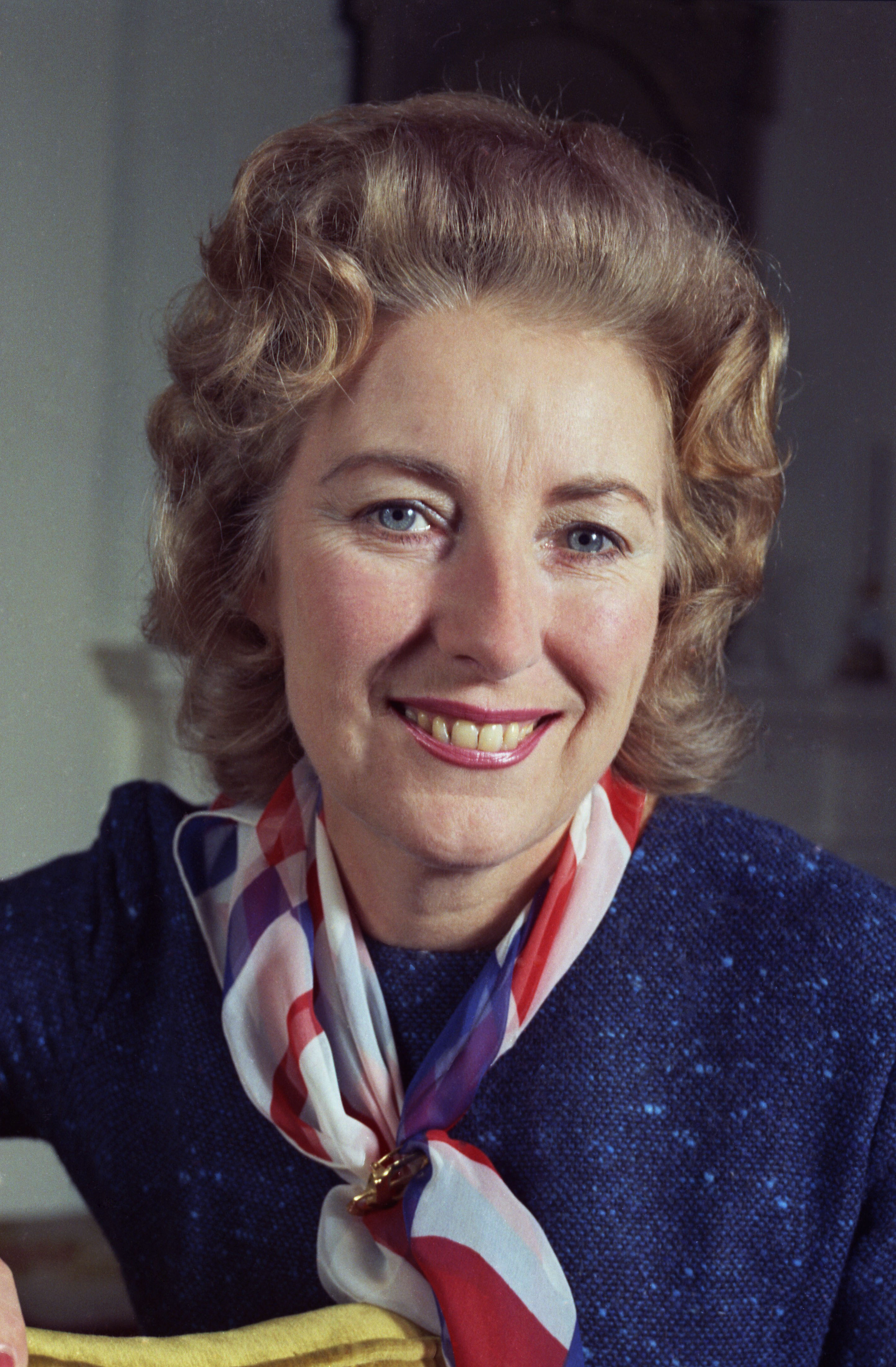
- Portrait by Allan Warren, c. 1973
- Born: Vera Margaret Welch; 20 March 1917; East Ham, Essex, England
- Died: 18 June 2020 (aged 103); Haywards Heath, West Sussex, England
- Years active: 1924–2020
- Spouse: Harry Lewis (m. 1941; died 1998)
- Children: 1
- Musical career
- Genres: Popular; traditional pop
- Labels: Decca; London for export; MGM; His Master's Voice; Columbia (EMI); EMI; Pye
- Military career
- Branch: Entertainments National Service Association
- Service years: 1939–1945
- Conflicts: Battle of Kohima

Dame Vera Margaret Lewis (née Welch; 20 March 1917 – 18 June 2020), known professionally as Vera Lynn, was an English singer and entertainer whose musical recordings and performances were popular during World War II. She is honorifically known as the "Forces' Sweetheart", having given outdoor concerts for the troops in Egypt, India, and Burma during the war as part of the Entertainments National Service Association. The Oxford Dictionary of National Biography wrote of Lynn, "Her reassuring voice and mastery of radio made her the forces' sweetheart in the Second World War—a connection she fostered with her ongoing commitment to veterans and memory of the war." The songs most associated with her include "We'll Meet Again", "(There'll Be Bluebirds Over) The White Cliffs of Dover" and "A Nightingale Sang in Berkeley Square".

Lynn remained popular after the war, appearing on radio and television in the United Kingdom and the United States and recording such hits as "Auf Wiederseh'n, Sweetheart" and her UK number-one single "My Son, My Son". In 2009, at the age of 92, she became the oldest living artist to top the UK Albums Chart with the compilation album We'll Meet Again: The Very Best of Vera Lynn. In 2017, Decca Records released Vera Lynn 100, a collection of younger artists duetting with archive recordings by Lynn. Issued to commemorate her centenary, it was a No. 3 hit, making her the first centenarian performer to have a Top 10 album in the charts. By the time of her death in 2020, she had been active in the music industry for 96 years.

She devoted much time and energy to charity work connected with ex-servicemen, disabled children, and breast cancer. She was held in great affection by Second World War veterans, and in 2000 was named the Briton who best exemplified the spirit of the 20th century.

== Early life ==
Vera Margaret Welch was born in East Ham, Essex, now part of the London Borough of Newham, on 20 March 1917. She was the daughter of a plumber, Bertram Samuel Welch (1883–1955), and his wife and dressmaker, Anne "Annie", née Martin (1889–1975), who had married in 1913. In 1919, when Lynn was two years old, she fell ill with diphtheritic croup and nearly died. She was sent to an isolation unit and was discharged after three months there. As a result of her hospitalisation, her mother was very protective of her and did not allow her to visit friends or play in the street for a long time afterwards. Lynn recalled that her mother was not as strict with her elder brother Roger as she was with her.

== Career ==
She began performing publicly at the age of seven and adopted her maternal grandmother Margaret's maiden name "Lynn" as her stage name when she was eleven. Aged 11, she joined a juvenile troupe called Madame Harris's Kracker Kabaret Kids. Early in 1933 she was spotted by Howard Baker, who invited her to join his band. In turn, she was taken on by Billy Cotton and briefly toured with his band in 1934 before returning to Baker.

It was with Baker that she made her first record on 17 February 1935, "It's Home". Her first radio broadcast, with the Joe Loss Orchestra, was made on 21 August 1935. At this point she appeared on records released by dance bands including those of Loss and of Charlie Kunz. In 1936, her first solo record was released on the Crown label, "Up the Wooden Hill to Bedfordshire". This label was absorbed by Decca Records in 1938. She supported herself by working as an administrative assistant to the head of a shipping management company in London's East End. After a short stint with Loss, she stayed with Kunz for around a year, during which she recorded several musical standards. She joined the Ambrose band in 1937 and remained with him until 1940, when she went solo.

=== Wartime career ===
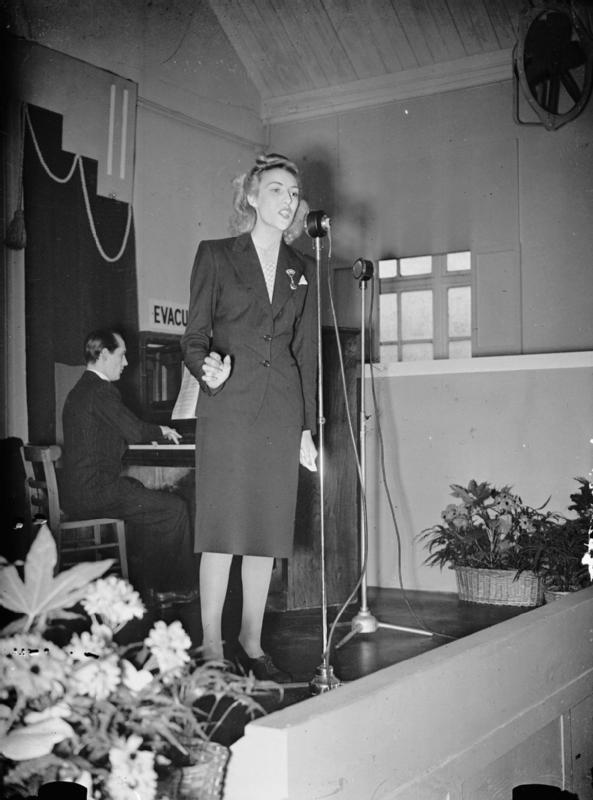
Lynn sings at a munitions factory in wartime Britain, early 1941.

Lynn's wartime contribution began when she would sing to people who were using London's tube station platforms as air raid shelters. She would drive there in her Austin 10 car. Between 1937 and 1940, she also toured with Bert Ambrose as part of the Ambrose Octet; the group appeared in broadcasts for the BBC and for Radio Luxembourg. She left Ambrose in 1940.

During the Phoney War in the early months of World War II, the Daily Express asked British servicemen to name their favourite musical performers: Vera Lynn came out on top and as a result became known as "the Forces' Sweetheart". On 1 July 1940, Lynn made her first appearance as a "fully fledged solo act" at the New Hippodrome in Coventry.

Lynn appeared in the revue Applesauce! with Max Miller, which commenced on 22 August 1940 at the Holborn Empire and ran until 9 September 1940. Its run was curtailed due to a bomb destroying the theatre. The revue continued at the London Palladium from 5 March 1941 and ended on 29 November that year. Lynn had to leave the show for a while in July 1941 to have her appendix removed.

Lynn is best known for the popular song "We'll Meet Again", written by Ross Parker and Hughie Charles. She first recorded it in 1939 with Arthur Young on Novachord, and later again in 1953 accompanied by servicemen from the British Armed Forces. The nostalgic lyrics ("We'll meet again, don't know where, don't know when, but I know we'll meet again some sunny day") were very popular during the war and made the song one of its emblematic hits. Amongst her other well-known wartime hits was "The White Cliffs of Dover", with words by Nat Burton and music by Walter Kent.

Her continuing popularity was ensured by the success of her weekly 30-minute radio programme Sincerely Yours, which began airing at 9:30 p.m. on 9 November 1941, with messages to British troops serving abroad. Described as "to the men of the forces – a letter in words and Music", she was accompanied by Fred Hartley and his music. Lynn and her quartet performed songs most requested by the soldiers. Lynn also visited hospitals to interview new mothers and send personal messages to their husbands overseas. However, in the aftermath of the fall of Singapore in February 1942 the programme was taken off air after the broadcast on 22 March 1942 for 18 months out of fear that the sentimental nature of her songs would undermine the "virile" nature of British soldiers. Instead, "more traditionally martial classical music" was promoted. Lynn returned with a regular show called It's Time for Vera Lynn on the BBC's Forces Programme on 31 October 1943, when she was accompanied by Peter Yorke and His Orchestra.

During the war years, she joined the Entertainments National Service Association and toured Egypt, India and Burma, giving outdoor concerts for British troops. In March 1944, she went to Shamshernagar airfield in Bengal to entertain the troops before the Battle of Kohima. Her host and lifelong friend Captain Bernard Holden recalled "her courage and her contribution to morale". In 1985, she received the Burma Star for entertaining British guerrilla units in Japanese-occupied Burma.

Between 1942 and 1944, she appeared in three movies with wartime themes. Firstly, she starred in a 1943 film called We'll Meet Again, which was based on her own life story, that of a dancer who becomes a radio star. She went on to make two more films during the war, Rhythm Serenade (1943) and One Exciting Night (1944). In Rhythm Serenade she played a school teacher. After her school is closed, she tries to join up. However, she is persuaded to organise a nursery for a munitions factory. One Exciting Night (also known as You Can't Do Without Love) was a dramatic musical comedy in which she helps thwart a gang of art thieves.

=== Postwar career ===
Lynn's only child, daughter Virginia Penelope Ann Lewis, was born on 10 March 1946. After the war, Lynn had wanted to concentrate on being a mother and wife. However, her unfulfilled contract with Decca Records and financial pressures meant that she was lured back into showbusiness in 1947. She started a new radio show called Vera Lynn Sings on the BBC's Light Programme on 16 February 1947. This was broadcast on Sunday evenings from 9:30-10:00 p.m. with Robert Farnon leading the musical accompaniment. Her husband became her manager. Lynn also recorded a cover of "You Can't Be True, Dear" in 1948, which charted in the US and peaked at No. 14 on the Billboard charts. In 1949, the BBC dropped her radio show because it claimed that there was no demand for her "sob stuff"; they wanted her to sing in a more lively style, so she made shows for Radio Luxembourg instead.

Lynn kept touring and recording, and in 1952 Lynn's British recording of a German song, "Auf Wiederseh'n, Sweetheart", became her best selling record. It became the first record by a British performer to top the charts in the United States, remaining there for nine weeks. In Britain, the song was the best-selling record of the year. She also appeared regularly for a time on Tallulah Bankhead's US radio programme The Big Show. "Auf Wiederseh'n, Sweetheart", along with "The Homing Waltz" and "Forget-Me-Not", gave Lynn three entries on the first UK Singles Chart in November 1952.

Lynn was in the London Laughs revue at the Adelphi Theatre, London from 12 April 1952 to 6 February 1954 with Tony Hancock and Jimmy Edwards. Her popularity continued in that decade, peaking with "My Son, My Son", a number-one hit in 1954, written by Gordon Melville Rees, Bob Howard and Eddie Calvert. It also reached No. 28 on Billboard magazine's singles charts in the USA.

In 1956, Lynn began her first television series for Associated-Rediffusion. During the same year, she signed an exclusive contract with the BBC for two years of radio and television work.

In 1960, she left Decca Records after nearly 25 years on the label and signed with EMI. She recorded for EMI's Columbia, MGM and His Master's Voice labels. She also recorded Lionel Bart's song "The Day After Tomorrow" for the 1962 musical Blitz!; she did not appear onstage in the play, but the characters in the play hear the song on the radio while they shelter from the bombs. In 1967, she recorded "It Hurts To Say Goodbye", a song which hit the top 10 on the Billboard Easy Listening chart.

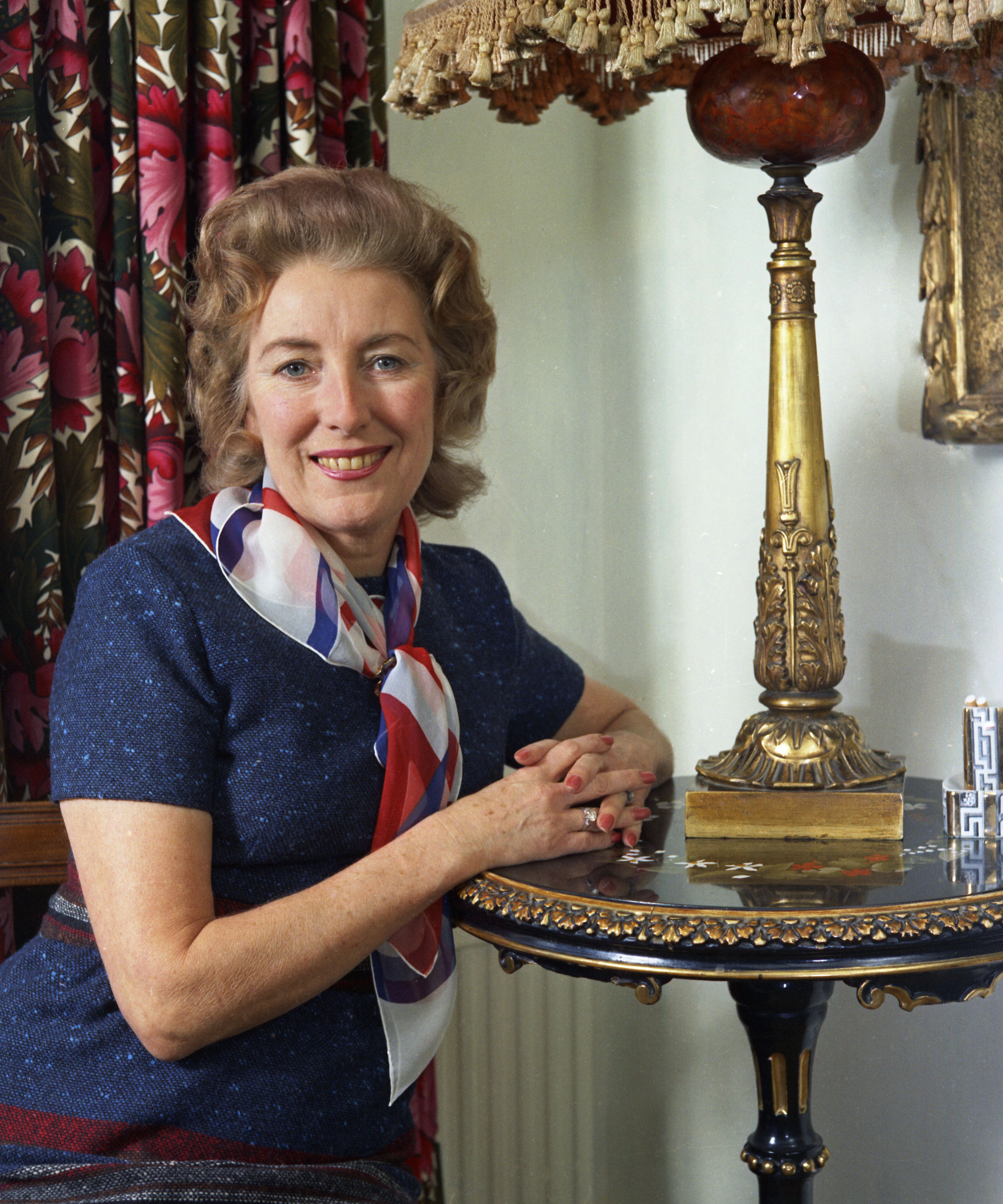
Vera Lynn in 1973

She hosted her own variety series on BBC1 in the late 1960s and early 1970s, and was a frequent guest on other variety shows, such as the 1972 Morecambe & Wise Christmas Show. In 1972, she was a key performer in the BBC anniversary programme Fifty Years of Music. In 1976, she hosted the BBC's A Jubilee of Music, celebrating the pop music hits of the period 1952 to 1976 to commemorate the start of Queen Elizabeth II's Silver Jubilee year. For ITV, she presented a 1977 TV special to launch her album Vera Lynn in Nashville, which included pop songs of the 1960s and country songs.

The Royal Variety Performance included appearances by Vera Lynn on seven occasions: 1951, 1952, 1957, 1960, 1975, 1986 and 1990. Lynn was also interviewed about her role in entertaining the troops in the India-Burma Theatre, for The World at War series in 1974. Lynn is also notable for being the only artist to have a chart span on the British single and album charts reaching from the chart's inception to the 21st century – in 1952 having three singles in the first ever singles chart, compiled by New Musical Express, and later having a No. 1 album with We'll Meet Again – The Very Best of Vera Lynn.

=== Recording career ===
Lynn's earliest solo recordings were issued on the Crown label. Her early dance band vocal refrain recordings include "I'm in the Mood for Love" and "Red Sails in the Sunset".

In 1938, the Decca label took over control of the British Crown label and the UK-based Rex label; they had also issued early singles from Lynn in 1937, including "Harbour Lights". In late September 1939, Vera Lynn first recorded a song that continues to be associated with her: "We'll Meet Again", originally recorded with Arthur Young on the Novachord.

Throughout the 1940s and 1950s, the Decca label issued all of Lynn's records, including several recorded with Mantovani and His Orchestra in 1942, and with Robert Farnon from the late 1940s. These were available only as 78 rpm singles, which contained only two songs as an A and a B-side. In the mid-1950s, Decca issued several EP singles, which comprised between two and four recordings per side, such as Vera Lynn's Party Sing Song from 1954. Lynn was the first British artist to have a number one in U.S. charts, achieved with "Auf Wiederseh'n Sweetheart", which stayed at the top for nine weeks in 1952. Singles were now issued on two formats: the known 78 rpm 10-inch shellac discs, and the recently introduced 45 rpm 7-inch vinyl single. In the late 1950s, Lynn recorded four albums at Decca, the first; Vera Lynn Concert remains her only live recording ever issued on vinyl.

In 1960, after more than 20 years at Decca Records, Lynn signed to the US based MGM Records. In the UK, her recordings were distributed by the His Master's Voice label, later EMI Records. Several albums and stand-alone singles were recorded with Geoff Love and His Orchestra. Norman Newell also took over as Lynn's producer in this period and remained with her until her 1976 album Christmas with Vera Lynn. Recording at EMI Records up until 1977, Lynn released thirteen albums with material as diverse as traditional hymns, pop and country songs, as well as re-recording many of her known songs from the 1940s for the albums Hits of the Blitz (1962), More Hits of the Blitz and Vera Lynn Remembers – The World at War (1974). In the 1980s, two albums of contemporary pop songs were recorded at the Pye Records label, both including covers of songs previously recorded by artists such as ABBA and Barry Manilow.

In 1982, Lynn released the stand-alone single "I Love This Land", written by André Previn, to mark the end of the Falklands War. Lynn's last recordings before her retirement were issued in 1991 via the News of the World newspaper, with proceeds in aid of the Gulf Trust.

=== Later years ===
Lynn sang outside Buckingham Palace in 1995 in a ceremony that marked the golden jubilee of VE Day. This was her last "official" public performance.

The United Kingdom's VE Day ceremonies in 2005 included a concert in Trafalgar Square, London, in which Lynn made a surprise appearance. She made a speech praising the veterans and calling upon the younger generation always to remember their sacrifice, and joined in with a few bars of "We'll Meet Again". This would be Lynn's final vocal performance at a VE Day anniversary event.

Following that year's Royal British Legion Festival of Remembrance Lynn encouraged the Welsh singer Katherine Jenkins to assume the mantle of "Forces' Sweetheart". In her speech Lynn said: "These boys gave their lives and some came home badly injured, and for some families life would never be the same. We should always remember, we should never forget, and we should teach the children to remember".

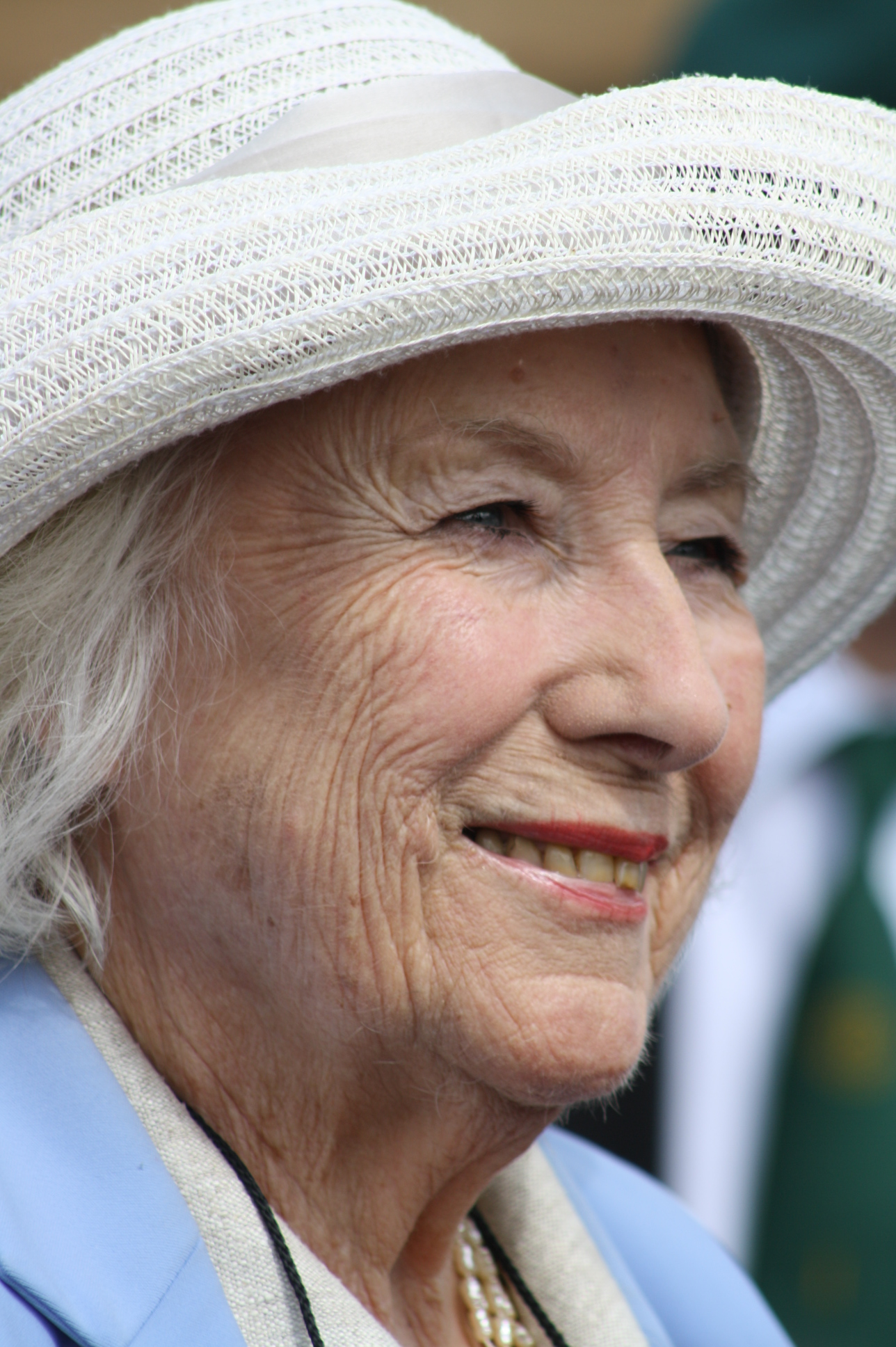
Lynn in 2009

In September 2008, Lynn helped launch a new social history recording website, "The Times of My Life", at the Cabinet War Rooms in London. Lynn published her autobiography, Some Sunny Day, in 2009. She had written two previous memoirs: Vocal Refrain (1975) and We'll Meet Again (1989).

In February 2009, it was reported that Lynn was suing the British National Party (BNP) for using "The White Cliffs of Dover" on an anti-immigration album without her permission. Her lawyer claimed the album seemed to link Lynn, who did not align with any political party, to the party's views by association.

In September 2009, at the age of 92, Lynn became the oldest living artist to make it to No. 1 in the British album chart. Her compilation album We'll Meet Again: The Very Best of Vera Lynn entered the chart at number 20 on 30 August, and then climbed to No. 2 the following week before reaching the top position, outselling both the Arctic Monkeys and the Beatles. With this achievement, she surpassed Bob Dylan as the oldest artist to have a number one album in the UK.

In August 2014, Lynn was one of 200 public figures who were signatories to a letter to The Guardian opposing Scottish independence in the run-up to September's referendum on that issue. In May 2015, she was unable to attend VE Day 70: A Party to Remember in London, but was interviewed at home by the Daily Mirror.

Three days before her 100th birthday on 17 March 2017, a new album entitled Vera Lynn 100 was released through Decca Records. The album, setting Lynn's original vocals to new re-orchestrated versions of her songs, also involved several duet partners, including Alfie Boe, Alexander Armstrong, Aled Jones and the RAF Squadronaires. Parlophone, which owns Lynn's later recordings from the 1960s and 1970s, released a collection of her songs recorded at Abbey Road Studios entitled Her Greatest from Abbey Road on 10 March 2017, including five previously unreleased original recordings. By October 2017, she was the best-selling female artist of the year in the UK, having sold more albums than Dua Lipa and Lana Del Rey.

Lynn received two nominations at the 2018 Classic Brit Awards for Female Artist of the Year and Album of the Year and was also the recipient of the Lifetime Achievement Award.

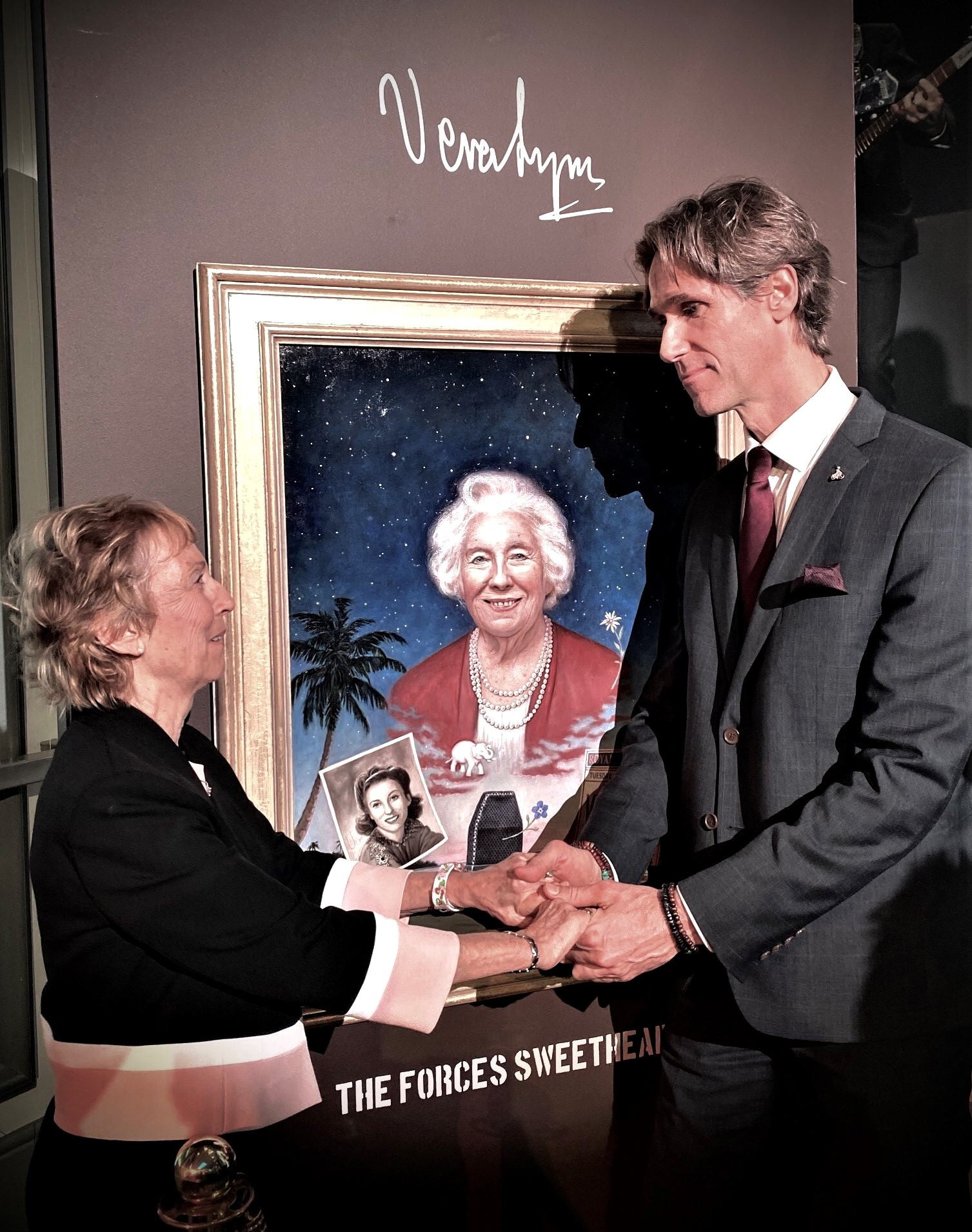
Dame Vera Lynn's daughter Virginia Lewis-Jones and Ross Kolby in front of his portrait of Lynn at the unveiling ceremony at the Royal Albert Hall on 13 January 2020.

In January 2020, a new painted portrait of Lynn was given as a gift from London Mint Office to the Royal Albert Hall in connection with the 75th anniversary of the peace in 1945. The portrait is painted by Ross Kolby and was unveiled by Lynn's daughter Virginia Lewis-Jones and Britain's Got Talent winner Colin Thackery.

On 5 April 2020 the song "We'll Meet Again" was echoed by Queen Elizabeth II in a television address she delivered addressing the COVID-19 pandemic. For the 75th anniversary of VE Day, Lynn and Katherine Jenkins duetted virtually (Jenkins singing next to a hologram) at the Royal Albert Hall, which was empty due to the COVID-19 pandemic.

In June 2021, a wildflower meadow on the White Cliffs of Dover was named in honour of Lynn.

== Honours and cultural references ==
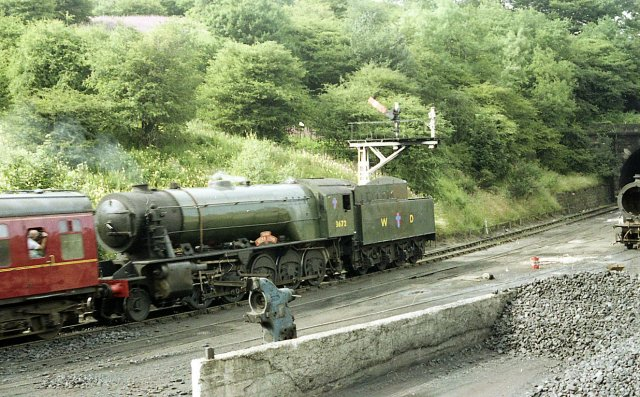
Locomotive No. 3672 Dame Vera Lynn at North Yorkshire Moors Railway.

In 1976, Lynn received an honorary Doctorate of Laws from the Memorial University of Newfoundland. She received the Honorary Freedom of the City of London in 1978. In 2000, she received a "Spirit of the 20th Century" Award in a nationwide poll in which she won 21% of the vote. A street named in her honour, Vera Lynn Close, is situated in Forest Gate, London. She was awarded the honorary degree of Master of Music (M.Mus.) in 1992 by the University of London.

She was the subject of This Is Your Life on two occasions, in October 1957 when she was surprised by Eamonn Andrews at the BBC Television Theatre, and again in December 1978, for an episode which was broadcast on 1 January 1979, when Andrews surprised her at the Café Royal, London.

In 2018, Lynn received the Outstanding Contribution to Music award at the Classic Brit Awards. In January 2019, it was reported that The London Mint Office had commissioned acclaimed Norwegian artist Ross Kolby to paint a portrait of Lynn. The painting was unveiled on 13 January 2020 and hangs in the Royal Albert Hall in London, where Lynn performed on 52 occasions.

Lynn's visit to the Burma front during the Second World War was included in the British television documentary series The World at War in 1974 and narrated by Laurence Olivier. A short interview made for the documentary is included in Episode 14, "It's A Lovely Day Tomorrow: Burma 1942–1944".

On their 1979 album The Wall, Pink Floyd released a song titled "Vera", referencing Vera Lynn and the song "We'll Meet Again" with the lyrics "Does anybody here remember Vera Lynn? / Remember how she said that / We would meet again / Some sunny day?". "We'll Meet Again" was also used as an intro to the live performances of The Wall in 1980 and 1981 (as can be heard on Is There Anybody Out There? The Wall Live 1980–81). The 1982 film Pink Floyd – The Wall opens with "The Little Boy that Santa Claus Forgot" performed by Lynn.

On Gary Numan's 1982 album I, Assassin, the song "War Songs" has the chorus: "Old men love war songs / Love Vera Lynn / Old men love war songs / Now I'm Vera Lynn".

The ending of Stanley Kubrick's black comedy film about the triggering of World War III (and the nuclear annihilation of civilisation), Dr. Strangelove, shows several minutes of nuclear explosions, with a musical accompaniment of the 1953 version of "We'll Meet Again" with Lynn and an armed services chorus.

A preserved example of the WD Austerity 2-10-0 class of steam locomotives at the North Yorkshire Moors Railway is named Dame Vera Lynn. One of two new boats for the Woolwich Ferry service, which were delivered via Tilbury in autumn 2018, was named Dame Vera Lynn in her honour.

On his 2018 album Would You Still Be in Love, Anthony Green released a song titled "Vera Lynn" that referenced her songs "We'll Meet Again" and "A Nightingale Sang in Berkeley Square".

=== British honours ===
- War Medal 1939–1945
- Burma Star
- Most Excellent Order of the British Empire
  - Officer, appointed "for services to the Royal Air Forces Association and other charities" (1969 New Year Honours).
  - Dame Commander, appointed for charitable services (1975 Birthday Honours).
- Officer of the Most Venerable Order of the Hospital of Saint John of Jerusalem (1997)
- Member of the Order of the Companions of Honour (2016 Birthday Honours), appointed for services to entertainment and charity.

=== Foreign honours ===
- Commander of the Order of Orange-Nassau, The Netherlands (1977)

== Charity work ==
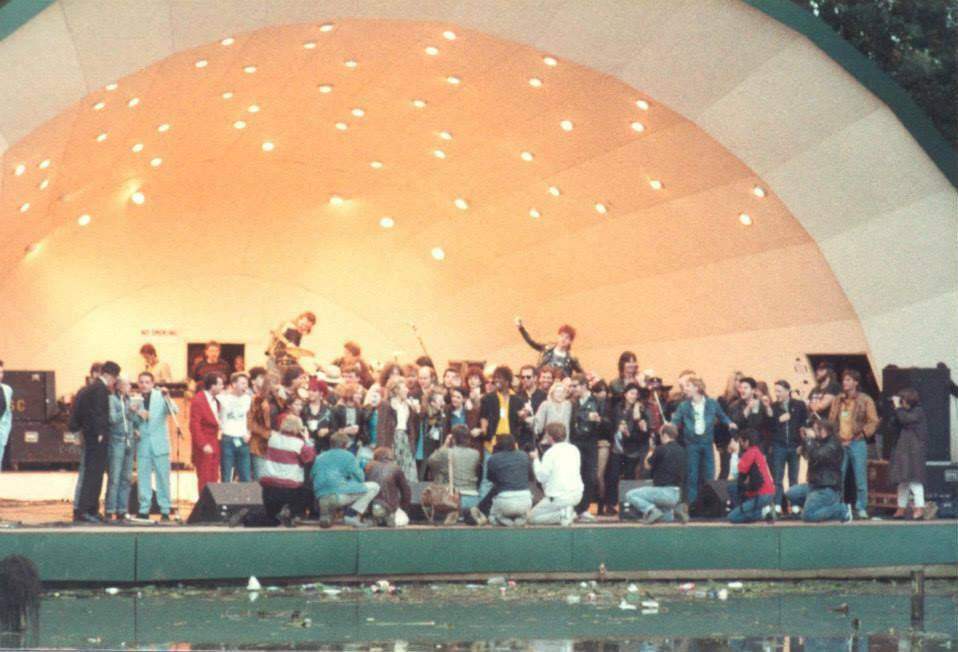
Vera Lynn, Hawkwind, and others at Crystal Palace Bowl, 24 August 1985

In 1953, Lynn formed the cerebral palsy charity SOS (The Stars Organisation for Spastics) and became its chairperson. The Vera Lynn Charity Breast Cancer Research Trust was founded in 1976, with Lynn its chairperson and later its president.

In August 1985, she appeared on stage at Crystal Palace Bowl, with Hawkwind, Doctor and the Medics and several other rock bands, for the finale of a benefit concert for Pete Townshend's Double-O anti-heroin charity.

In 2002, Lynn became president of the cerebral palsy charity The Dame Vera Lynn Trust for Children with Cerebral Palsy, and hosted a celebrity concert on its behalf at Queen Elizabeth Hall in London. In 2008, Lynn became patron of the charitable Forces Literary Organisation Worldwide for ALL.

She became the patron of the Dover War Memorial Project in 2010; the same year she became patron of the British charity Projects to Support Refugees from Burma/Help 4 Forgotten Allies. In 2013 she joined a PETA campaign against pigeon racing, stating that the sport is "utterly cruel". When PETA bought three of the King's racing pigeons at auction in 2024, they renamed one 'Vera' in recognition of Lynn's campaigning work.

== Personal life ==
During the Second World War, Lynn lived with her parents in a house she had bought in 1938 at 24 Upney Lane, Barking. In 1941, Lynn married Harry Lewis, a clarinetist, saxophonist and fellow member of Ambrose's orchestra whom she had met two years earlier. They rented another house in Upney Lane, near her parents' house. Lewis became Lynn's manager prior to 1950, after leaving his own career behind.

After the Second World War, Lynn and Lewis moved to Finchley, north London, and had a daughter. The couple lived in Ditchling, East Sussex, from the early 1960s onwards, living next door to their daughter.

Harry Lewis died in 1998.

== Death and funeral ==
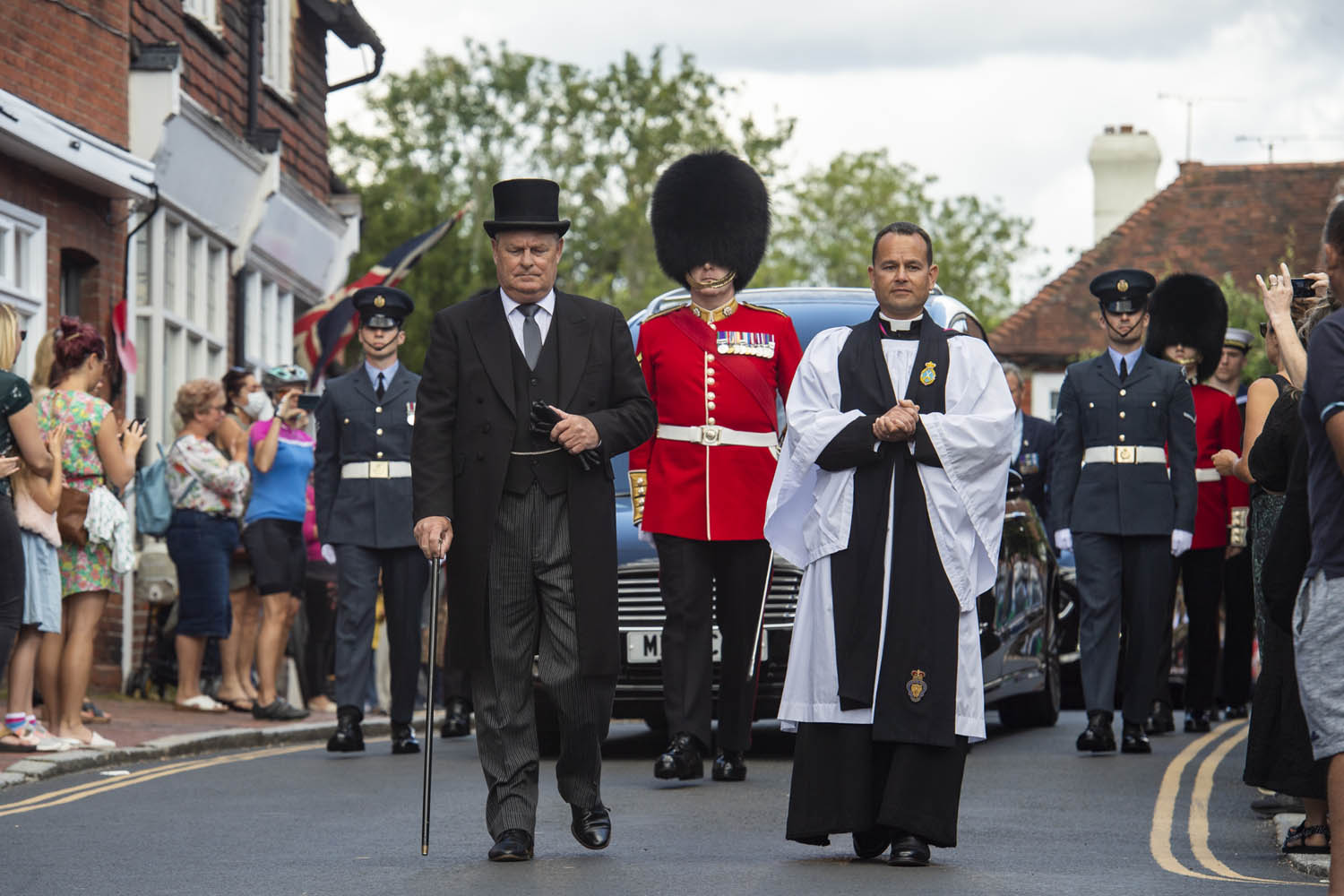
Funeral procession

Lynn died from pneumonia at the Princess Royal Hospital in Haywards Heath on 18 June 2020, aged 103. Tributes to Lynn were led by the Royal Family, with Queen Elizabeth II sending private condolences to Lynn's family, and Clarence House issuing tributes from the then Prince Charles and the Duchess of Cornwall. The then Prime Minister, Boris Johnson, and Leader of the Opposition, Sir Keir Starmer, also led with tributes in Parliament, while musicians including Sir Paul McCartney and Katherine Jenkins and public figures such as Captain Tom Moore discussed her impact. The Band of the Coldstream Guards convened the same day to play "We'll Meet Again".

Lynn was given a military funeral, which was held on 10 July 2020 in East Sussex. The procession made its way from her home in Ditchling to the Woodvale Crematorium in Brighton; it was widely attended by the public. Ditchling was decorated with poppies, a symbol of military remembrance. Ahead of the funeral, the White Cliffs of Dover had images of Lynn projected onto them, as "We'll Meet Again" was being played across the English Channel. Her cortege was accompanied by members of the Royal Air Force, the British Army, the Royal Navy, and the Royal British Legion, as well as the Battle of Britain Spitfire flypast, which followed the cortege and passed over Ditchling three times (10 July 2020 was the 80th anniversary of the start of the Battle of Britain). Her coffin was draped in a Union Flag with a wreath. At the family service at the Woodvale Crematorium chapel, she was serenaded by a Royal Marine bugler. On 21 March 2022, a thanksgiving service for Lynn was held at Westminster Abbey.

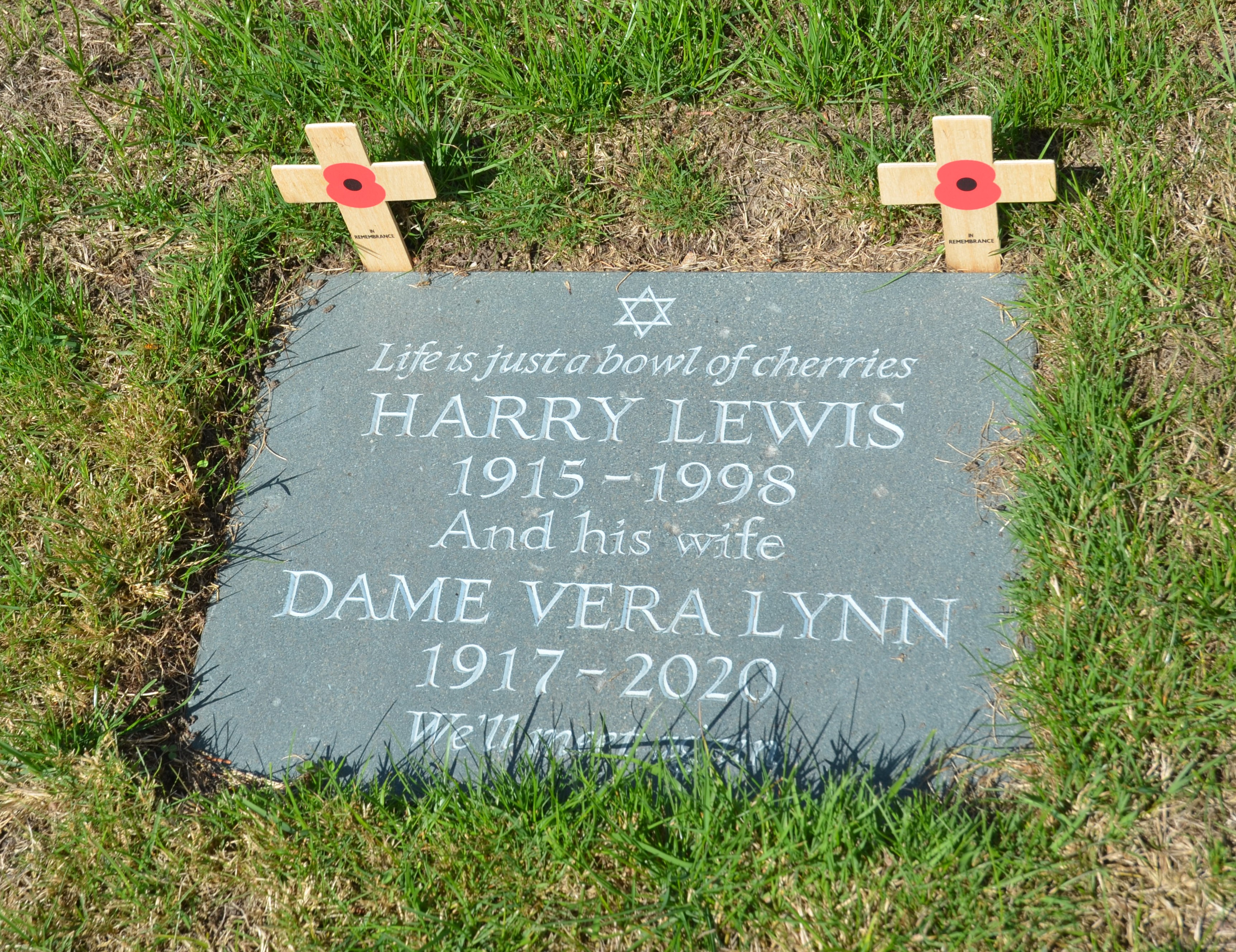
Memorial tablet in the churchyard of St Margaret's Church, Ditchling, East Sussex

== Legacy ==
Writing in the Oxford Dictionary of National Biography, Christina Baade stated, "As a singer Lynn was known for her distinctive, low voice, excellent diction and pitch, and deep sincerity. She embraced 'greeting card songs', expressing familiar but meaningful sentiments, and remained true to her creative vision throughout a career spanning over seven decades."

Following Lynn's death, Katherine Jenkins began campaigning to erect a statue of her by the White Cliffs of Dover, a reference to one of Lynn's signature songs, "(There'll Be Bluebirds Over) The White Cliffs of Dover". Sculptor Paul Day, who had previously been responsible for the Battle of Britain Monument, London on the Victoria Embankment in London, agreed to design the Lynn memorial. The memorial subsequently evolved into The Forces' Sweetheart And Wartime Entertainers' Memorial, honouring Lynn and "all those unsung heroes who entertain in times of conflict". The memorial is set to be unveiled in Dover in 2026.

The American rock band My Chemical Romance would play her song "We'll Meet Again" on tape on 13 August 2025 during a concert in Nashville, Tennessee.

== Discography ==
=== Studio albums ===
Title	Details	Peak chart positions	Certifications
Title	Details	UK	Certifications
Sincerely Yours	Released: 1949; Label: Decca	—	
Vera Lynn Concert	Released: 1955; Label: Decca	—	
If I Am Dreaming	Released: 1956; Label: Decca	—	
The Wonderful World of Nursery Rhymes	Released: 1958; Label: Decca	—	
Vera Lynn Sings...Songs of the Tuneful Twenties	Released: 1959; Label: Decca	—	
Sing With Vera (With the Williams Singers and Geoff Love & His Orchestra)	Released: 1960; Label: MGM Records	—	
Yours (With the Williams Singers and Geoff Love & His Orchestra)	Released: 1960; Label: MGM Records	—	
As Time Goes By (With the Williams Singers and Geoff Love & His Orchestra)	Released: 1961; Label: MGM Records	—	
Hits of the Blitz (With Tony Osborne & His Orchestra)	Released: 1962; Label: His Master's Voice	—	
The Wonderful Vera Lynn (With Tony Osborne & His Orchestra)	Released: 1963; Label: His Master's Voice	—	
Among My Souvenirs (With Tony Osborne & His Orchestra)	Released: 1964; Label: His Master's Voice	—	
More Hits of the Blitz (With the Sam Fonteyn Orchestra)	Released: 1966; Label: His Master's Voice	—	
Hits of the 60's – My Way (With Alyn Ainsworth and Orchestra)	Released: 1970; Label: Columbia	—	
Unforgettable Songs by Vera Lynn (With Alyn Ainsworth and Orchestra)	Released: 1972; Label: Columbia	—	
Favourite Sacred Songs (With the Mike Sammes Singers)	Released: 1972; Label: Columbia	—	
Vera Lynn Remembers – The World at War (With Alyn Ainsworth and Orchestra)	Released: 1974; Label: EMI	—	
Christmas with Vera Lynn (With Alyn Ainsworth and Orchestra)	Released: 1976; Label: EMI	—	
Vera Lynn in Nashville	Released: 1977; Label: EMI	—	
Thank You For the Music (I Sing The Songs)	Released: 1979; Label: Pye	—	
Singing To the World	Released: 1981; Label: Pye	—	
20 Family Favourites	Released: 21 November 1981; Label:	25	UK: Gold
Vera Lynn Remembers	Released: 1984; Label: Nelson	—	
We'll Meet Again	Released: 9 September 1989; Label: Telstar	44	
Unforgettable	Released: 30 May 2010; Label: Decca	61	

=== Selected compilation albums ===
Title	Details	Peak chart positions									Certifications
Title	Details	UK	IRE	EU	DUT	NOR	NZ	DEN	BEL	AUS	Certifications
Hits of the War Years	Released: August 1985; Label: Hammard; Format: LP, Cassette	—	—	—	—	—	—	—	—	32	
We'll Meet Again: The Very Best of Vera Lynn	Released: 25 August 2009; Label: Decca Records; Formats: CD, digital download	1	48	8	83	18	8	28	10	21	UK: Platinum
National Treasure – Ultimate Collection	Released: 8 June 2014; Label:	13	—	—	—	—	—	—	—	—	
Her Greatest from Abbey Road	Released: 10 March 2017; Label: Parlophone	45	—	—	—	—	—	—	—	—	
Vera Lynn 100	Released: 17 March 2017; Label: Decca Records	3	—	—	—	—	—	—	—	—	UK: Gold

=== Charted singles ===
Year	Title	Peak chart positions			
Year	Title	UK	US	US A/C	US Cashbox
1948	"You Can't Be True, Dear"	—	9	—	—
1949	"Again"	—	23	—	—
1952	"Auf Wiederseh'n, Sweetheart"	10	1	—	1
1952	"Forget-Me-Not"	5	—	—	—
1952	"The Homing Waltz"	9	—	—	—
1952	"Yours (Quiéreme Mucho)"	—	7	—	10
1953	"The Windsor Waltz"	11	—	—	—
1954	"We'll Meet Again"	—	29	—	—
1954	"If You Love Me (Really Love Me)"	—	21	—	5
1954	"My Son, My Son"	1	28	—	22
1956	"Who Are We"	30	—	—	—
1956	"Such a Day"	—	96	—	45
1956	"A House with Love in It"	17	—	—	—
1957	"The Faithful Hussar (Don't Cry My Love)"	29	55	—	40
1957	"Travellin' Home"	20	—	—	—
1967	"It Hurts to Say Goodbye"	—	—	7	—
2014	"We'll Meet Again" (duet with Katherine Jenkins)	72	—	—	—
2020	"We'll Meet Again"	55	—	—	—
2020	"Land of Hope and Glory"	17	—	—	—

== Filmography ==
Film	Year	Role	Notes	Ref
We'll Meet Again	1942	Peggy Brown		
Rhythm Serenade	1943	Ann Martin		
One Exciting Night	1944	Vera Baker	also known as You Can't Do Without Love	
Venus fra Vestø	1962	Herself		
A Gift for Love	1963		music performance	

== Publications ==
- Lynn, Vera (1975). Vocal Refrain. London: W. H. Allen
- Lynn, Vera and Cross, Robin (1989). We'll Meet Again. London: Sidgwick & Jackson
- Lynn, Vera (2009). Some Sunny Day. London: HarperCollins. ISBN 978-0-00-731815-5
- Lynn, Vera and Lewis-Jones, Virginia (2017). Keep Smiling Through: My Wartime Story. London: Century. ISBN 978-1-78089-834-6
