= VE Day 70: A Party to Remember =

70th anniversary concert for Victory in Europe Day

- Swing and traditional pop concert by various artists with spoken word recitals
- Venue: Horse Guards Parade, London, England
- Date: 9 May 2015

VE Day 70: A Party To Remember was a 1940s themed concert and party held on Saturday 9 May 2015 on Horse Guards Parade in London. It was hosted by The Royal British Legion, as part of the three-day celebration to commemorate the 70th anniversary of Victory in Europe Day.

== Performances ==
The concert was presented by Chris Evans. Performers in order of first appearance:

- Diversity – dancing to "Puttin' On the Ritz" and "Sing, Sing, Sing (With a Swing)"
- Richard E. Grant – Ministry of Information advice
- Colin Salmon – Ministry of Information advice
- Alexander Armstrong – "We Must All Stick Together" (by Ralph Butler & Raymond Wallace), "London Pride"
- Collabro - "We Must All Stick Together", "Wish Me Luck as You Wave Me Goodbye"
- Bernard Cribbins – words of Jeffrey Illey, ten year-old evacuee
- Status Quo – "In the Army Now"
- Robert Lindsay – Winston Churchill's May 1940, August 1940 and May 1945 speeches
- Laura Wright – "Wish Me Luck as You Wave Me Goodbye"
- Katherine Jenkins – "He Wears a Pair of Silver Wings", "A Nightingale Sang in Berkeley Square", "We'll Meet Again"
- Pixie Lott – "Sally"
- Chas & Dave – "Run, Rabbit, Run", "Leaning on a Lamp-post", "When I'm Cleaning Windows", "You Are My Sunshine", "We're Going to Hang out the Washing on the Siegfried Line", "Roll Out the Barrel"
- Elaine Paige – "(There'll Be Bluebirds Over) The White Cliffs of Dover"
- Honeysuckle Weeks – Chotie writing to Dicker
- Laurence Fox – Dicker Writing to Chotie
- Gregory Porter – "As Time Goes By"
- Ian Lavender – words of Bill Miles, Home Guard volunteer
- Laura Wright, Pixie Lott and Rebecca Ferguson – "Boogie Woogie Bugle Boy"
- Blue – "Five Minutes More"
- Strictly Come Dancing professional dancers – "A Nightingale Sang in Berkeley Square", "In the Mood"
- Julia Sawalha – words of Marion Gardner, Land Army girl
- Alfie Boe – "You'll Never Walk Alone", "Run", "We'll Meet Again"
- Jane Horrocks – words of Lt. George. F . Morrison, 7th Battalion of the Royal Highlanders
- Martin Shaw – 'For the Fallen'

A message from Dame Vera Lynn was also read out, filmed interviews were shown, and actor Adrian Lester read an account of fighter pilot Hugh Dundas. World War II veterans, including Chelsea pensioners, were guests of honour.

== Broadcast ==
The concert was broadcast live on BBC Radio 2 from 7.30pm to 10.00pm, with a later broadcast on BBC One and BBC One HD from 8.30pm to 10.25 pm. Ken Bruce provided commentary for the radio broadcast and the event was produced by Mark Simpson for the BBC.
