= I Love This Land =

"I Love This Land" is a 1982 song by Vera Lynn that was released as a single in the aftermath of the Falklands War. The song was written by André Previn and Leslie Bricusse, and credited to "Vera Lynn and The Victory Group". The B-side was "The Victory Theme". It was released on State Records.

Lynn performed "We'll Meet Again" and "I Love This Land" at Portsmouth Harbour upon the return of the troops from the war. Lynn also performed the song at close of the Berkleley Square Ball in July 1982.

In his 2011 book A Patriotism for Today, theologian Keith Clements described the song as a "syrupy number" and that "I Love This Land" was "...the final confirmation, if any were needed, that an exercise in nostalgia for the emotional certainties of the past was taking place rather than an encounter with the global realities of the 1980s". The song was also critiqued as an act of nostalgia in the Glasgow Media Group's book The Glasgow Media Group Reader, Vol. II: Industry, Economy, War and Politics who wrote that upon the release of the song "...the BBC not only treated this as news" but "also gave us an historical introduction and extracts from her song accompanied by wartime stills of the 'forces' sweetheart' and current film of her wandering through an English country garden".

The Glasgow Media Group noted that other songs released for the Falklands War such as Crass's "How does it feel (to be the mother of 1000 dead?)" that "lack the patriotic element" of "I Love This Land" and "...do not make news in quite the same way".
