= Kolby (given name) =

Kolby is a given name. Notable people with the given name include:

- Kolby Allard (born 1997), American baseball player
- Kolby Carlile (born 1997), American Flat Track racer
- Kolby Koloff (born 1996), American musician
- Kolby LaCrone (born 1986), American soccer player
- Kolby Listenbee (born 1994), American football player
- Kolby Smith (born 1984), American football player

== See also ==
- Kolby (surname)
