= Till We Meet Again =

Till We Meet Again may refer to:

- "Till We Meet Again" (1918 song), a popular 1918 song by Richard A. Whiting and Raymond B. Egan
- Till We Meet Again (1922 film), a 1922 silent American melodrama film
- Till We Meet Again (novel), a 1988 novel
  - Judith Krantz's Till We Meet Again, a 1989 television miniseries based on the novel
- Till We Meet Again (Singaporean TV series), a Singaporean drama series
- 'Til We Meet Again, a 1940 film starring Merle Oberon and George Brent
- Till We Meet Again (1936 film), directed by Robert Florey
- Till We Meet Again (1944 film), directed by Frank Borzage
- Till We Meet Again (2016 film), directed by Bank Tangjaitrong
- Till We Meet Again (2019 film), directed by Steven Ma
- Till We Meet Again (2021 film), directed by Giddens Ko
- Till We Meet Again, an album by The Machine
- "Till We Meet Again", a 1991 single by Inner City
- "Till We Meet Again", a song from the album John P. Kelly
- "Till We Meet Again", a song from the album Chicago VIII
- "Till We Meet Again", a song from the album Kirk Franklin and the Family
- "Till We Meet Again", a song from the album Ceremony of Opposites
- "Till We Meet Again", a duet by Tetuzi Akiyama and Jason Kahn
- "Till We Meet Again", ending theme of Canadian show Don Messer's Jubilee

== See also ==
- We'll Meet Again (disambiguation)
