= Ambrose (bandleader) =

English bandleader and violinist (1896–1971)

- Ambrose in 1938

Background information
- Also known as: Ambrose
- Born: Benjamin Baruch Ambrose; 11 September 1896; Warsaw, Congress Poland, Russian Empire
- Died: 11 June 1971 (aged 74) Leeds, West Riding of Yorkshire, England
- Genres: British dance band
- Occupations: Musician; Bandleader
- Instrument: Violin
- Years active: 1916–1971

Benjamin Baruch Ambrose (11 September 1896 – 11 June 1971), known professionally as Ambrose, was an English bandleader and violinist. Ambrose became the leader of a highly acclaimed British dance band, Ambrose & His Orchestra, in the 1930s.

== Early life ==
Ambrose was born to a Jewish family in Warsaw in 1896, when it was part of Congress Poland within the Russian Empire. After a time the family moved to London. His father was Lewis Ambrose (died 1962), his mother Rebecca or Becky (died 1945); it is unclear whether the family used the Ambrose surname in Poland.

In the 1911 England Census, his father Lewis, is shown as a "Dealer in rags" (wife, Becky, "Assisting in the business"), and Ambrose as Barnett, a "Violin student musician". He began playing the violin while young, and at the age of 15 travelled to New York City with his aunt. He began playing professionally, first for Emil Coleman at New York's Reisenweber's restaurant, then in the Palais Royal's big band. After making a success of a stint as bandleader, at the age of 20 he was asked to put together and lead his own fifteen-piece band. After a dispute with his employer, he moved his band to another venue, where they enjoyed considerable popularity.

While at the Palais Royal, on 5 June 1918, he registered for the draft (Local Board Division 169, City of NY NY, 144 St Nicholas Ave; Registration 232). He gave as his date of birth 11 September 1896; place of birth Warsaw, Russia; nationality Russian; father's birthplace Grietza, Russia; place of employment Palais Royal, 48th Street & Broadway; nearest relative Mrs Becky Ambrose, mother, 56 "Blaksley" Street, London, England. He signed as "Bert Ambrose". The registrar recorded medium height, medium build, brown hair, brown eyes and no physical disability that would render him exempt from the draft.

In 1922, Ambrose returned to London, where he was engaged by the Embassy Club to form a seven-piece band. He stayed at the Embassy for two years, before walking out on his employer to take up a much more lucrative job at the Clover Gardens in New York. After a year there, besieged by continual pleas to return from his ex-employer in London, in 1925 he was finally persuaded to go back by a cable from the Prince of Wales: "The Embassy needs you. Come back—Edward".

This time Ambrose stayed at the Embassy Club until 1927. The club had a policy of not allowing radio broadcasts from its premises, however, and this was a major drawback for an ambitious bandleader, largely because the fame gained by radio work helped a band to gain recording contracts (Ambrose's band had been recorded by Columbia Records in 1923, but nothing had come of this). He therefore accepted an offer by the May Fair Hotel, with a contract that included broadcasting. His annual salary from this establishment alone was £10,000.

During his time at the Embassy, he married "Kathryn Lucille otherwise Kitty Brady", a 24-year-old Irish-American from New Jersey, on 20 January 1924. Oddly, he is named and signed as "Bernard Ambrose", a 27-year-old "Musical Director", on the marriage certificate. They had two daughters, Patricia S (b. 1931) and Monica J (b. 1933).

Ambrose stayed at the May Fair for six years, during which time the band made recordings for Brunswick Records, His Master's Voice and Decca. He teamed up with Richard Rodgers and Lorenz Hart, along with an American harmony song trio, the Hamilton Sisters and Fordyce (aka Three X Sisters), to record songs including "My Heart Stood Still" among others. This period also saw the musical development of the band, partly as a result of Ambrose's hiring of first-class musicians, including Sylvester Ahola, Ted Heath, Joe Crossman, Joe Jeannette, Bert Read, Joe Brannelly, Dick Escott and trumpeter Max Goldberg.

== 1930s and 1940s ==
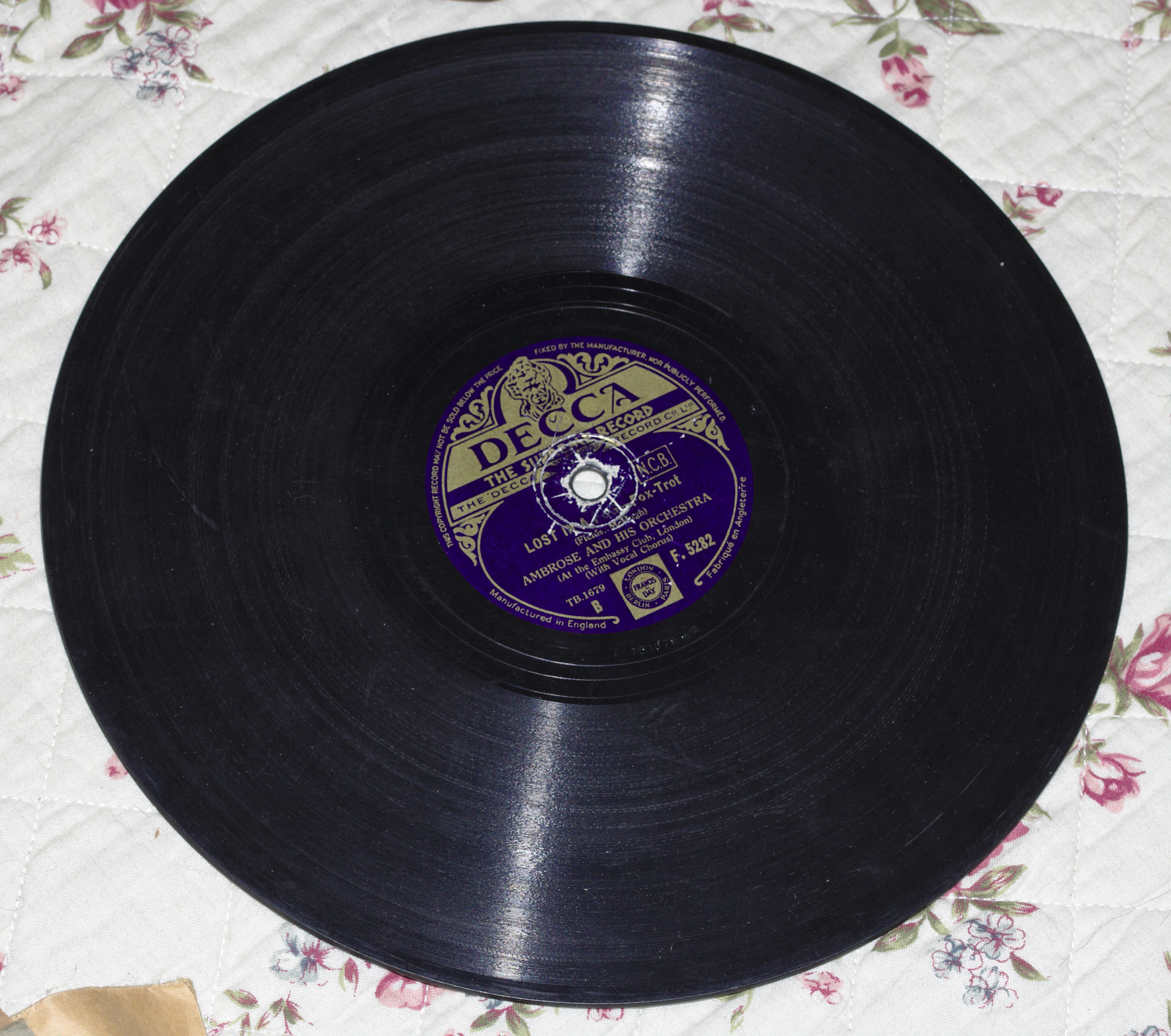
Gramophone record of Ambrose at the Embassy Club in 1934

In 1933, Ambrose was asked to accept a cut in pay at the May Fair; refusing, he went back to the Embassy Club, and after three years there (and a national tour), he rejected American offers and returned to the May Fair in 1936. He then went into partnership with Jack Harris, an American bandleader, and in 1937 they bought a club together, Ciro's Club. For a period of three months, they employed Art Tatum. Ambrose and Harris alternated performances at Ciro's until a disagreement led to the rupture of their partnership. Ambrose then worked at the Café de Paris until the outbreak of the Second World War, when he again went on tour.

On 7 July 1939 at Blenheim Palace, less than two months before war was declared, it was the Ambrose band which played for the lavish coming-out party held for 17 year-old Lady Sarah Consuelo Spencer-Churchill. There were over 700 guests, including Winston Churchill and Anthony Eden, the house and gardens were lit up and visible for miles, and the band played in a pavilion as the guests danced on the vast lawn into the early morning. It was by far the highlight of the social season, and in hindsight has been styled by some as "the last season ever". Socialite Henry (Chips) Channon noted in his diary: “I have seen much, travelled far and am accustomed to splendour, but there has never been anything like tonight”.

His major discovery in the years leading up to the war was the singer Vera Lynn, who sang with his band from 1937 to 1940 and, during the war, became known as the "Forces' Sweetheart". Lynn married Harry Lewis, a clarinettist in the band, in 1939. Other singers with the Ambrose band included Sam Browne, Elsie Carlisle, Denny Dennis, who recorded a number of duets with Vera Lynn, Max Bacon (also the band's drummer), Evelyn Dall and Anne Shelton, with whom "When That Man is Dead and Gone", a jibe at Adolf Hitler, written by Irving Berlin, was recorded in 1941. Ambrose's signature tune was "When Day is Done".

After a short period back at the May Fair Hotel, Ambrose retired from performing in 1940, although he and his orchestra continued to make records for Decca until 1947. Several members of his band became part of the Royal Air Force band, the Squadronaires, during the war. Ambrose's retirement was not permanent, however, and he formed and toured with the Ambrose Octet, dabbling in management. His final widespread tour of Britain took place from May to September 1956. From then on he remained active in management, with his artistes including Kathy Kirby.

== 1950s and 1960s ==
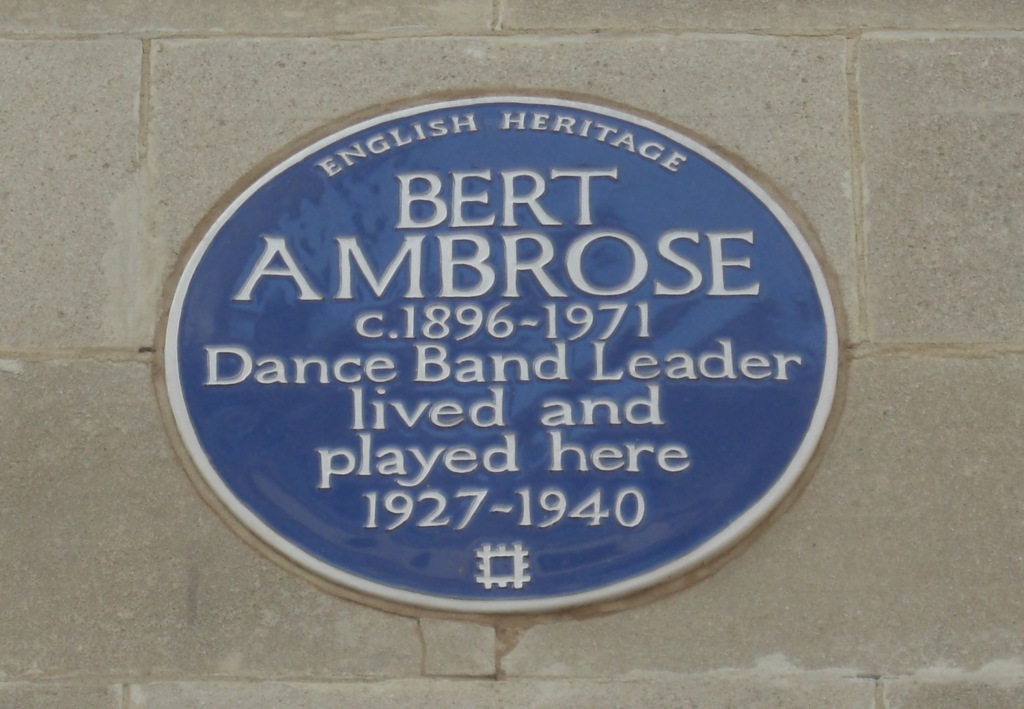
Tribute to Bert Ambrose at the May Fair hotel in London

In the mid-1950s, despite appearances in London's West End and a number of recordings for MGM, Ambrose, in common with other bandleaders, was struggling because rock and roll had arrived. He was forced to start performing in small clubs with casual musicians, and his financial position deteriorated catastrophically. His situation was saved, however, by his discovery of the singer Kathy Kirby, whom he heard singing at the age of 16 at the Ilford Palais. He started a long personal relationship with Kirby and promoted her career.

It was during the recording of one of Kirby's television programmes (at the Yorkshire Television studios) that Ambrose collapsed, dying later the same night in Leeds General Infirmary. He was buried in the Bushey Jewish Cemetery, Hertfordshire. His music was kept alive after his death by, among others, Radio 2 broadcasters Alan Dell and Malcolm Laycock, the latter continuing to play his records into the 21st century.

Specialist dance band radio stations, such as Radio Dismuke and Swing Street Radio, continue to play his records. Ambrose also features regularly on the Manx Radio programme Sweet & Swing, presented by Howard Caine.

Ambrose was commemorated in 2005 by a blue plaque unveiled on the May Fair Hotel.
