= My Son, My Son =

Single by Vera Lynn with Frank Weir
- Released: October 1954
- Recorded: 1954
- Genre: Traditional popular music
- Label: Decca Records
- Songwriter(s): Gordon Melville Rees, Bob Howard and Eddie Calvert
- Producer(s): Frank Lee

Vera Lynn with Frank Weir singles chronology
""The Windsor Waltz"" (1953)	"My Son, My Son" (1954)	""Who Are We"" (1956)

"My Son, My Son" is a traditional popular music song written by Gordon Melville Rees, Bob Howard and Eddie Calvert in 1954. A recording of the song by Vera Lynn reached number one in the UK Singles Chart in November that year. It was Lynn's only UK number one hit on the official chart, a feat she achieved long after the period she became most associated with as the Forces' Sweetheart in World War II. However, there was no official singles sales chart in the UK at that time, so her recordings of songs which she has subsequently become more familiar with, such as her 1939 signature song, "We'll Meet Again", did not feature on any contemporary charts.

Earlier, in July 1952, she had reached number one on the U.S. Billboard chart with her recording of "Auf Wiederseh'n Sweetheart", making her the first British artist to achieve this milestone. This was several months before the launch of the UK singles chart in November of that year, when it peaked at number 10; the song had, however, already reached number one on the UK's sheet music chart.

"My Son, My Son" was Lynn's fifth singles chart hit in the UK, following on from "Auf Wiederseh'n Sweetheart", "Forget-Me-Not", "The Homing Waltz" (all 1952) and "The Windsor Waltz" (1953).

Lynn's version of the song was produced by Frank Lee and released on Decca Records F.10372. The full credit on Lynn's record read 'Vera Lynn with Frank Weir, his Saxophone, his Orchestra and Chorus'. When the song topped the charts, co-writer Calvert became the second number-one recording star, after Mantovani, to write a number one hit for someone else.

A recording by Frankie Vaughan and Vocal Group with Geoff Love and his orchestra was made in London on September 19, 1954. It was released by EMI on the His Master's Voice label as catalog number B 10766.

== See also ==
- List of UK Singles Chart number ones of the 1950s
