= Wish Me Luck as You Wave Me Goodbye =

1939 popular music song

"Wish Me Luck as You Wave Me Goodbye" is a song by Phil Park and Harry Parr-Davies, made popular during the Second World War by Gracie Fields. It appeared in Fields's 1939 film Shipyard Sally. Its use in the film is patriotic, Stephen C. Shafer argues, although the song in this context did not reference the war, as the film was made prior to its outbreak.

Over the years it has been performed and recorded by many artists, including Vera Lynn, Elsie Carlisle, Chas & Dave, Cyril Grantham and Jack Hylton. It also featured in the film The History Boys. The song is also used in movie Mera Naam Joker of Bollywood directed by Raj Kapoor while the student Raju was saying goodbye to his teacher after her wedding.

Laura Wright and Collabro performed the song at VE Day 70: A Party to Remember at Horse Guards Parade in London. The song was performed by Coronation Street's Hilda Ogden in her final episode. The character, known for her off-key singing, chose this as her farewell song.
