= Marit Kolby =

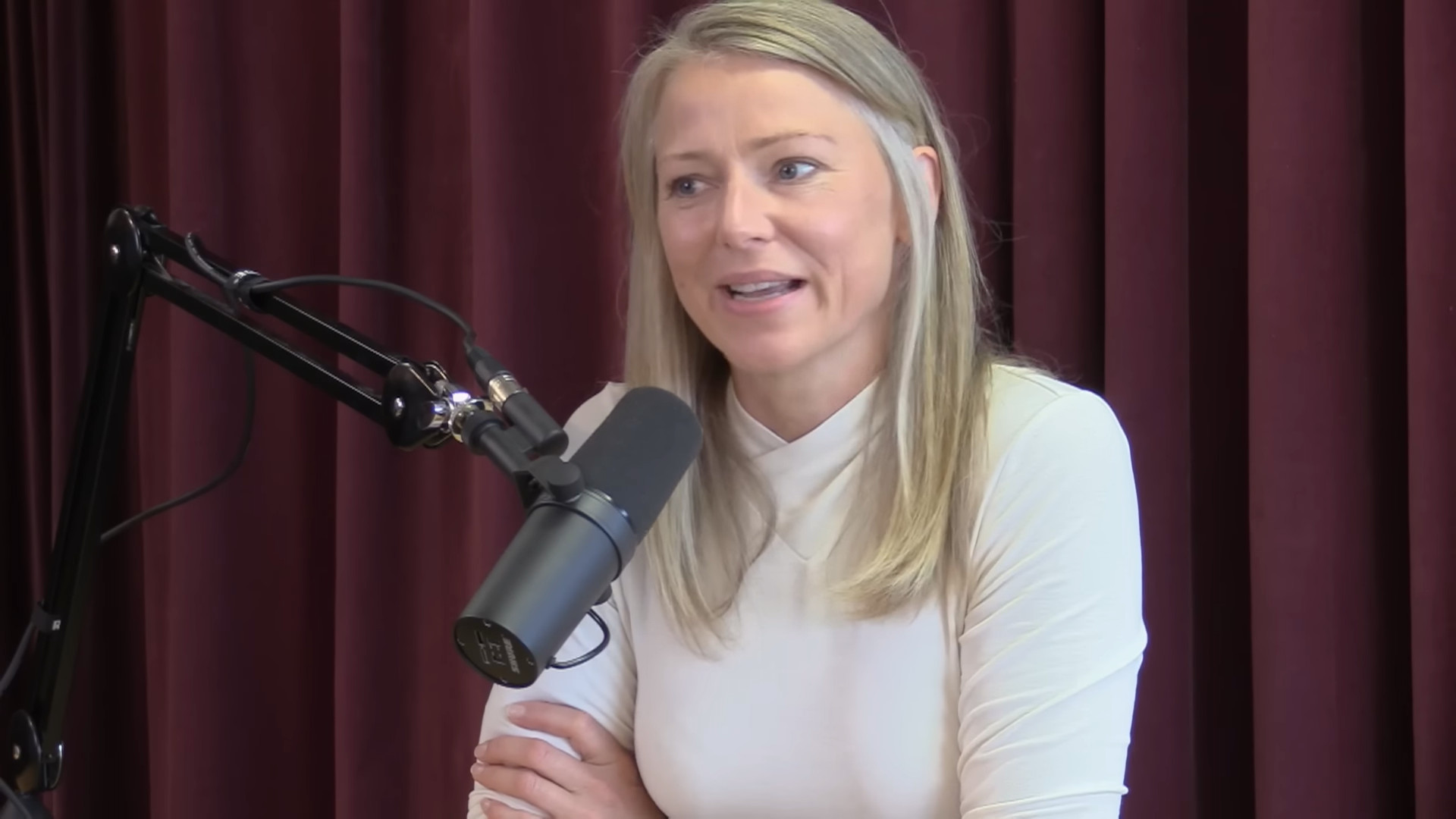
- Marit Kolby on Wolfgang Wee in 2024
- Born: 30 September 1975 (age 50)
- Education: Norwegian University of Life Sciences; University of Oslo
- Occupations: Nutritionist, lecturer, author
- Website: www.maritkolby.no

Marit Kolby (born 30 September 1975) is a Norwegian nutritional biologist, university lecturer and author.

== Career ==
Kolby is a university lecturer and researcher at Oslo Nye Høyskole. She has published two books – a nutrition textbook and a cookbook, and also runs the blog “Matlyst!” and an Instagram profile.

In the field of nutrition, she criticizes, among other things, ultra-processed food and Norwegian dietary guidelines.

Her education includes a bachelor's degree in food science from the Norwegian University of Life Sciences and a master's degree in nutritional biology from the University of Oslo.

The book What and when should we eat? became the fifth best-selling book in Norway in 2022 according to the Norwegian Booksellers Association's bestseller list.

== Personal life ==
Kolby has two children. Her sister Hanne Fisher is a psychologist, and they collaborated on Kolby's second publication, The Cookbook – What Should We Eat?.

Kolby previously worked in sales and administration at Vero Moda , a clothing chain.

== Bibliography ==
- Hva og når skal vi spise? (Frisk forlag, 2022)
- Kokeboka – hva skal vi spise? (Frisk forlag, 2023) – med Hanne Fisher
