= Harry Lewis (musician) =

English musician (1915–1998)

- Also known as: Charles Rogers
- Born: Harris Copperman; 11 January 1915; Whitechapel, London, England
- Died: 29 April 1998 (aged 83) Haywards Heath, West Sussex, England
- Genres: British dance band, big band
- Occupations: Musician; Composer; Business manager Music publisher Record producer
- Instruments: Alto saxophone, tenor saxophone, clarinet
- Years active: 1937–1998
- Labels: Decca, His Master's Voice, Columbia

Harry Lewis (born Harris Copperman; 11 January 1915 – 29 April 1998) was an English saxophonist and clarinettist, who was best known as the husband of singer Vera Lynn.

== Early life ==
He was born to a Jewish family in Whitechapel, in the East End of London on 11 January 1915, and originally named Harris Copperman; his parents were Jack "Jacob" Copperman and Rachel "Ray" (née Cohen) Copperman. Harris, who would be professionally known as Harry Lewis, had three sisters; Minnie, Betty and Lily. His father was also a musician, and the family lived in Hackney.

== Dance band career ==
In April 1937, Lewis took part in a broadcast on BBC Radio as part of Bram Martin's Dance Orchestra. Lewis made his earliest recordings with a dance band as part of George Elrick's group that year, playing clarinet and alto saxophone on Elrick's recordings for Columbia from August 1937 to April 1938. Lewis subsequently joined Jack Harris and his Orchestra, and played alto saxophone on their Ciro's Club sessions for His Master's Voice from January to March 1939.

In August 1939, Lewis met Vera Lynn, when he joined Bert Ambrose's eponymous orchestra, with whom she was a vocalist. Together with eight other members of the Ambrose orchestra, Lewis joined the Royal Air Force at the start of the Second World War, and they subsequently formed a new band, The Royal Air Force Dance Orchestra (who were known as The Squadronaires after the war). The musicians had presented themselves at RAF Uxbridge, and having signed up, went to leave as they had an engagement with Ambrose that night. The commanding officer had to immediately give them a week's emergency leave, and they arrived just before the start of the evening's show. Though they were one of the country's top dance bands, they were only paid five shillings a day in the RAF.

From September to November 1939, Lewis played clarinet and tenor saxophone on the Decca recordings by Ambrose, including those with vocals by Lynn; she cut her last recording as a dance band vocalist with Ambrose on 11 July 1940. During this period, Lewis provided clarinet and alto saxophone for Jack Jackson and his Band's final recording session in November 1939, released by His Master's Voice. Lewis played clarinet and alto saxophone on The RAF Dance Orchestra's Decca recordings from their inaugural session in May 1940 to July 1945.

After a long courtship, Lewis and Lynn married in West Ham in August 1941. The RAF Dance Orchestra performed all over the United Kingdom during the war, and were occasionally accompanied by Lynn on vocals. In November 1943, he took part in a Tribute to Swing concert at Cheltenham Town Hall, playing clarinet and saxophone with Alec Cave and his BBC Quintet, billed as "Ace Swing Stylists from the Coconut Grove". Lewis was billed as "Clarinet and Sax Jive Virtuoso". Towards the end of the war, Lewis re-joined Ambrose's band, playing alto saxophone on their recordings in 1945.

== Post-war career ==
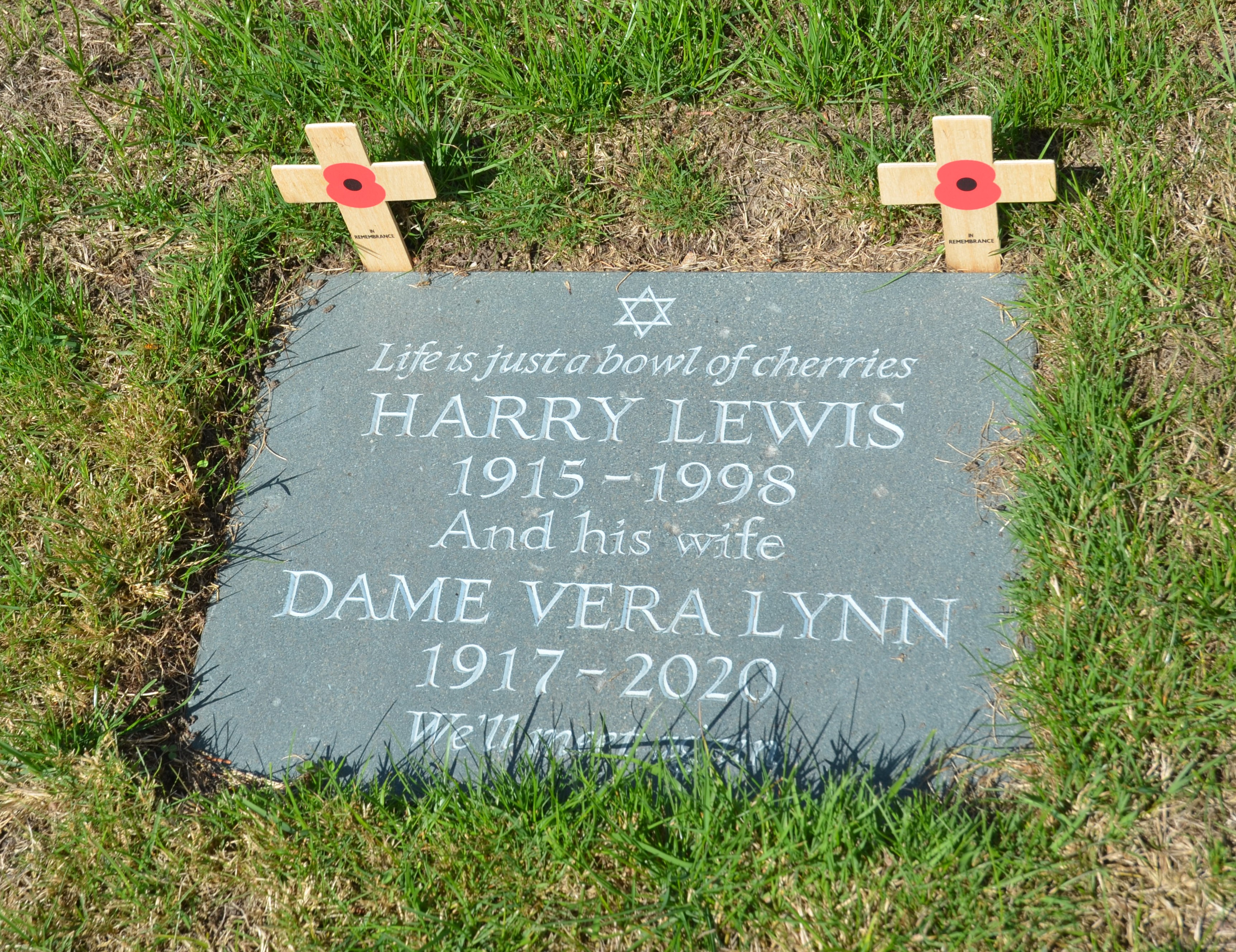
Memorial tablet in the churchyard of St Margaret's Church, Ditchling, East Sussex

Lewis worked as Lynn's manager after the war, and accompanied her on her international concerts, overseeing lighting and production of her shows. Lewis also worked as a music publisher, and composed music. He wrote "This Perfect Day", which was recorded by his wife and released as a single in 1949. Together with Barry Gray, Lewis co-wrote "The Little Swiss Waltz", which was recorded by Mantovani and his Orchestra and released by Decca in 1954. Lewis (under the pseudonym Charles Rogers) and Gray also wrote "To Love, To Love is Wonderful", which was published in 1956. The song was recorded by Don Rennie and released on Parlophone.

From 1965 to 1968, Lewis was general manager of EMI's in-house publishing firm Ardmore and Beechwood. Lynn's 1967 singles "It Hurts to Say Goodbye" (which made No. 7 on the Billboard Adult Contemporary chart) and "Santa Maria" were produced by Lewis. Her last studio album, Vera Lynn Remembers, issued in 1984, was also produced by Lewis.

== Personal life and death ==
After the war, Lynn and Lewis moved to Finchley, north London. The couple lived in Ditchling, East Sussex, from the early 1960s onwards, living next door to their daughter, Virginia. Lewis died peacefully in hospital in Haywards Heath, West Sussex, on 29 April 1998, aged 83. A private funeral service for Lewis was held in Brighton.

Lewis' and Lynn's ashes are buried at St. Margaret's Churchyard in Ditchling (Section C, Row 1, Grave 14C).
