= We'll Meet Again (1943 film) =

- Spanish poster
- Directed by: Philip Brandon
- Written by: John L. Arthur (script contribution); James Seymour (screenplay); Derek Sheils (story); Howard Thomas (script contribution)
- Produced by: Ben Henry; George Formby (associate producer)
- Starring: Vera Lynn; Geraldo; Patricia Roc; Ronald Ward
- Cinematography: Stephen Dade
- Edited by: Alan Jaggs
- Music by: Harry Bidgood
- Production company: Columbia Productions
- Distributed by: Columbia Pictures
- Release date: 18 January 1943
- Running time: 84 minutes
- Country: United Kingdom
- Language: English
- Box office: £89,519 (UK)

We'll Meet Again is a 1943 British musical film directed by Philip Brandon and starring Vera Lynn. The plot is loosely based on the life of its star, otherwise known as Britain's "Forces' Sweetheart".

== Plot ==
The film is set during the blitz in London.

Peggy is a young dancer in a London music hall. When the audience are invited to stay in the hall during a raid she is invited to sing to entertain them and is praised for her singing voice. Peggy's best male friend Frank Foster is an aspiring songwriter and they work together on new tunes, largely in the big band style. Meanwhile, she encourages the young boy in the family to leave London as part of the evacuation plans.

Although she's reluctant at first to sing, she finally does, debuting with a song "After the Rain".

An old school friend, the kilt-wearing Bruce McIntosh, returns on leave from the Scots Guards and starts to seeing Peggy. However, he confesses his love is for Peggy's friend, Ruth. Peggy reunites them and sings Ave Maria at their wedding.

Peggy and her friend record a demo of a tune they wrote and it accidentally gets played on BBC radio. Frank gets a letter inviting him to the BBC but they explain they are interested only in the singer. Peggy insists, successfully, that they give Frank a contract too.

She quickly becomes a star. She makes a special radio broadcast on St Andrew's Day. She makes a dedication to Bruce and tells him he is a father, but she later is told he did not hear it as he was on patrol and is now missing in action. However it turns out he was only wounded.

Peggy and Frank give an open air concert to several hundred RAF crew, singing "Sincerely Yours" and "We'll Meet Again" and the film ends.

== Cast ==
- Vera Lynn as Peggy Brown
- Geraldo as Gerry
- Patricia Roc as Ruth Cole
- Ronald Ward as Frank Foster
- Donald Gray as Bruce McIntosh
- Frederick Leister as Mr. Hastropp
- Betty Jardine as Miss Bohne
- Brefni O'Rorke as Doctor Drake
- Marian Spencer as Mrs. Crump
- Lesley Osmond as Sally
- Aubrey Mallalieu as stage door keeper

== Critical reception ==
The Monthly Film Bulletin wrote: "The story is simple and the varied situations lack originality, but Vera Lynn's charming voice and extensive repertoire of songs more than atone. The acting on the whole is good, especially the comedy of Frank Leister as Mr. Hartropp of the B.B.C. and of Betty Jardine as his earnest secretary."

TV Guide called the film "a fine morale booster which served its purpose in 1942."

Sky Movies wrote, "not a great film by a long way, but it's a rich – and rarely-seen – slice of nostalgia."
