= Kolby Carlile =

American motorcycle racer (born 1997)

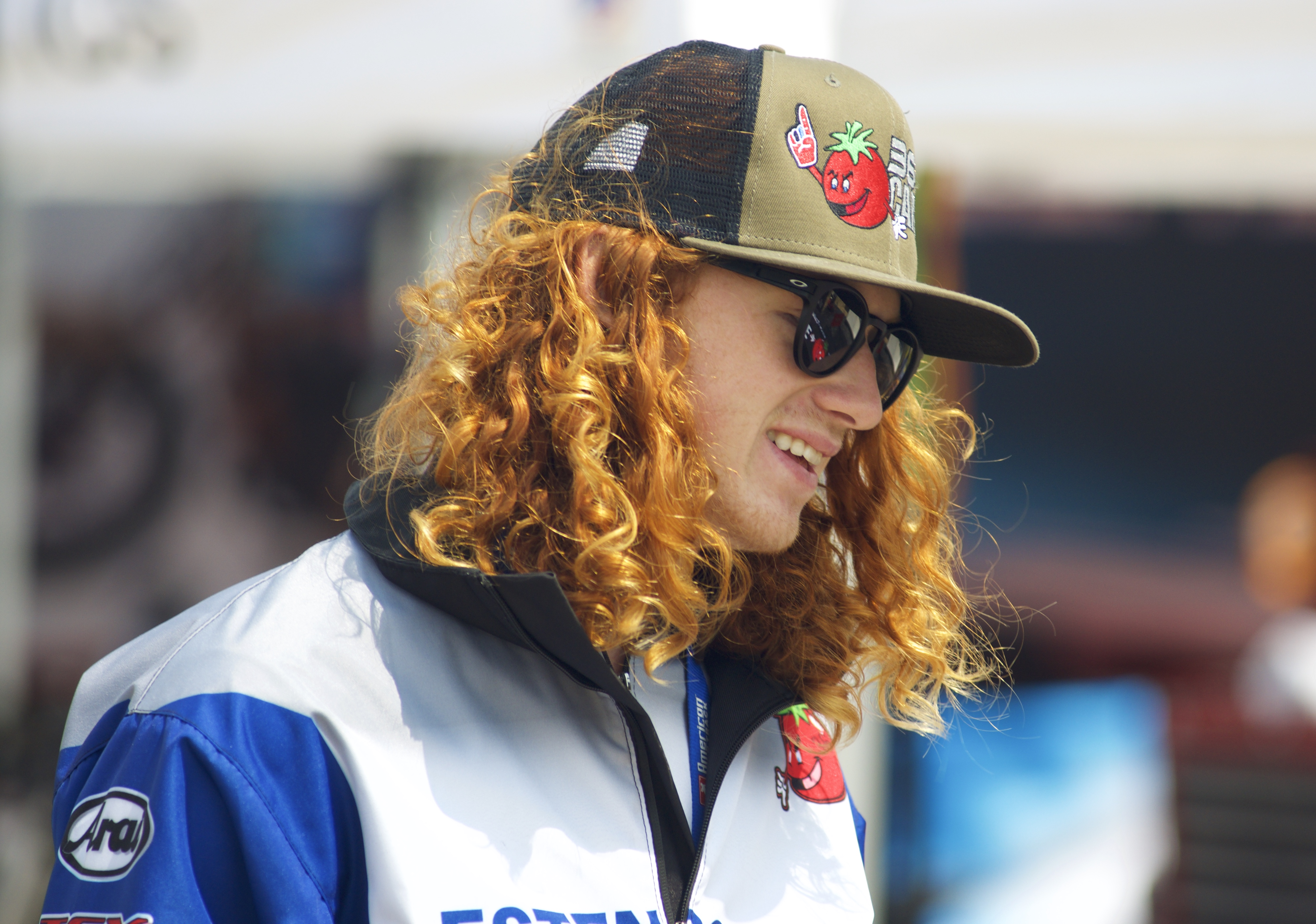
- Carlile in 2017
- Born: July 5, 1997 (age 29); Canandaigua, New York, United States
- Current team: Estenson Racing Yamaha MT-07
- Bike number: 36

Kolby Carlile (born July 5, 1997) is an American Flat Track racer from the United States who has competed in the championship since 2013, winning the American Flat Track Singles Championship in 2017.

== American Flat Track ==
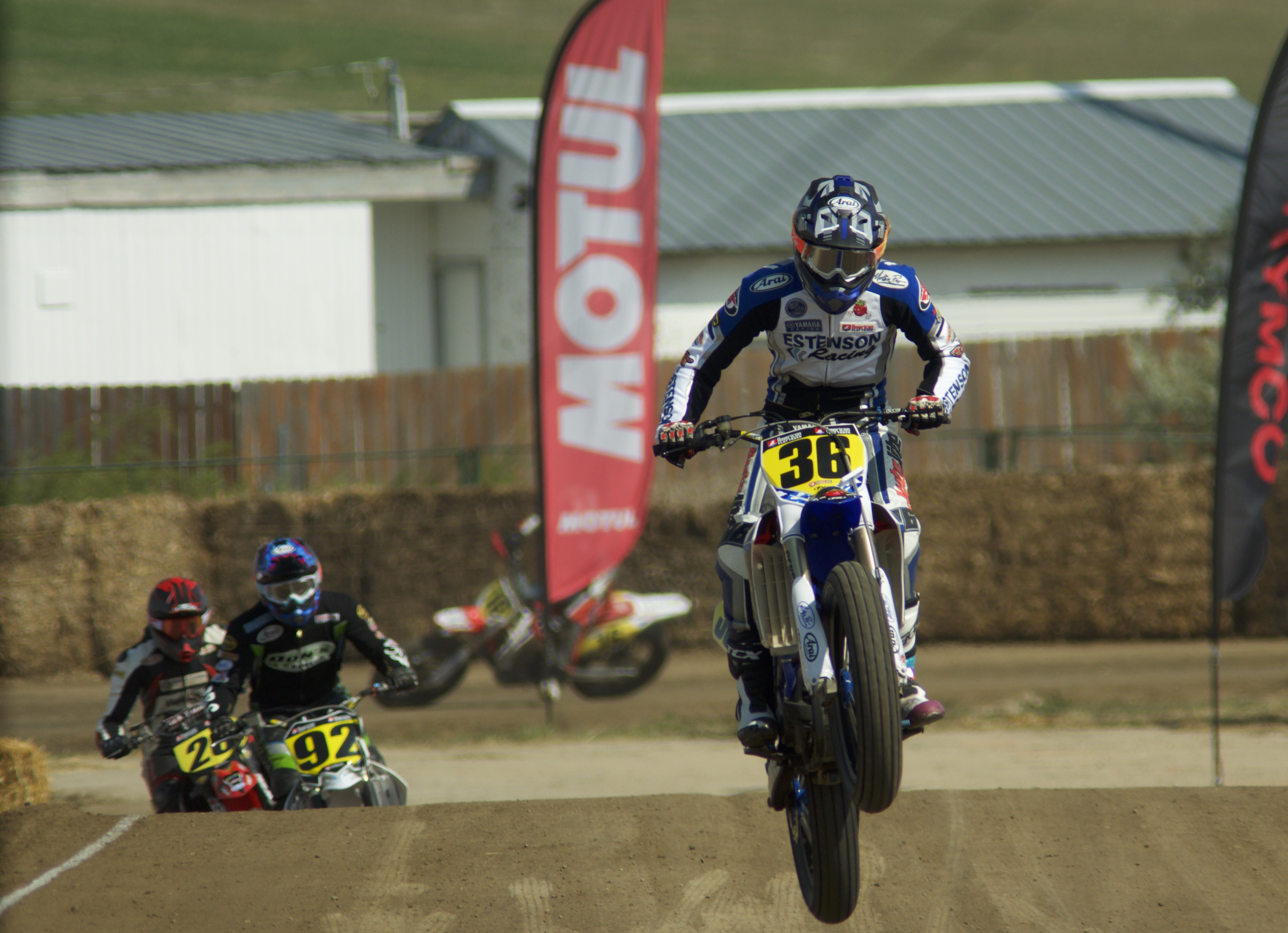
Kolby Carlile (36) at the Sturgis TT 2017.

Carlile has raced in the AMA Pro Flat Track Series since 2013, and started at the age of 16. He finished 18th at the Hagerstown, Maryland in his rookie year. In 2014, Carlile raced in eight main events and scored four top-ten finishes to earn ninth place in the championship. In 2015, Carlile scored seven top-ten finishes for tenth place in the championship. Carlile finished fourth in the 2016 season with his first victory at the Charlotte Half-Mile. He joined the Estenson Racing Team in July 2017.

== Career highlights ==
- 2013– Rookie year, AMA GNC2 Championship K.C. Cycle KTM 450 SX-F
- 2014– 9th, AMA GNC2 Championship K.C. Cycle KTM 450 SX-F
- 2015– 10th, AMA GNC2 Championship K.C. Cycle KTM 450 SX-F
- 2017– American Flat Track Singles Champion Extension Racing Yamaha YZ450F

Preceded by Davis Fisher	American Flat Track Singles Champion; 2017	Succeeded by Present
