= Ross Kolby =

Norwegian painter (born 1970)

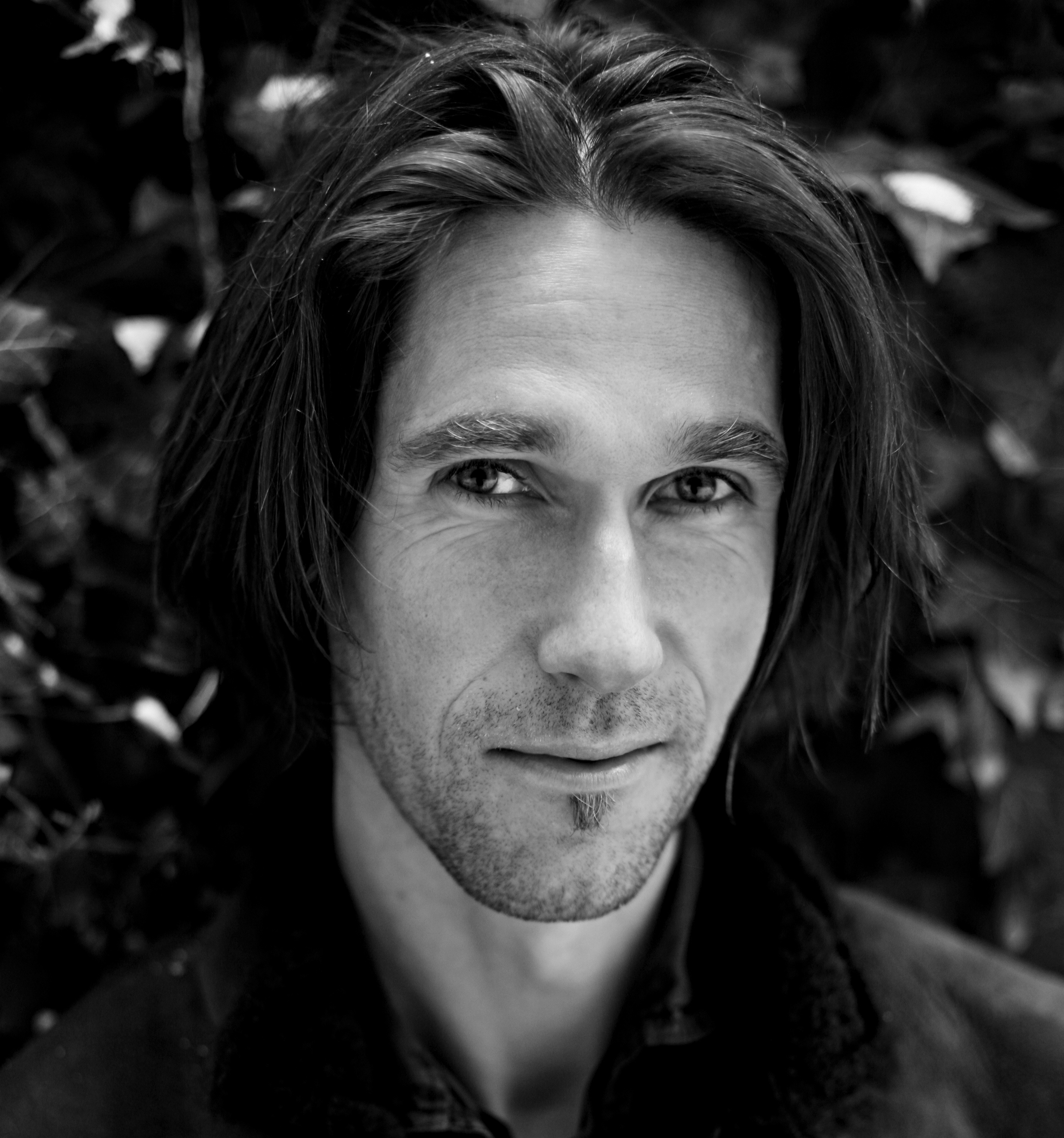
- Born: 7 November 1970 (age 55); Baerum, Norway
- Occupations: Artist, author
- Years active: 1996–present
- Website: rosskolby.com

Ross Kolby (born 7 November 1970) is a Norwegian visual artist and author. His paintings are often political and reference classical art, historical events and debate contemporary topics. With the use of both modern and classical symbols as well as symbolic persons Kolby has worked with themes like racism, the clerical abuse of children in the Catholic Church and the Anders Behring Breivik 2011 Norway Attacks. He also works extensively with portraits and has among others painted the three generations of Norwegian monarchs involved in the events of WWII, Dame Vera Lynn and Elizabeth II.

His paintings have been donated to Norway's Crown Regalia Museum, Norway's Resistance Museum, Royal Norwegian Navy Museum as well as to the Royal Albert Hall. Kolby has also published two novels, a fantasy story about the 12-year-old English boy Will O'Phillie and a historical drama from the witch processes in Northern Norway in the 1600s.

== Education ==
Kolby is educated at Asker kunstfagskole (1991–1992), Oslo National Academy of the Arts (1992–1998) and Accademia di Belle Arti di Roma (1995). He lived and worked in Copenhagen from 1999 to 2004, but has since then been located in Oslo.

== Artwork ==
In his works, Kolby debates themes such as racism, handicapped people's rights, environmental problems, sexual abuse of children, war and political conflict. He has several times used popes as symbols in his paintings. Kolby received death threats when he was about to exhibit his historical motif The murder of Pope John Paul I in 1997 and withdrew the artwork from the show. The canvas was subsequently exhibited the year after. Also in his works dealing with racism and catholic priests' sexual abuse of children Kolby uses a pope as the motif.

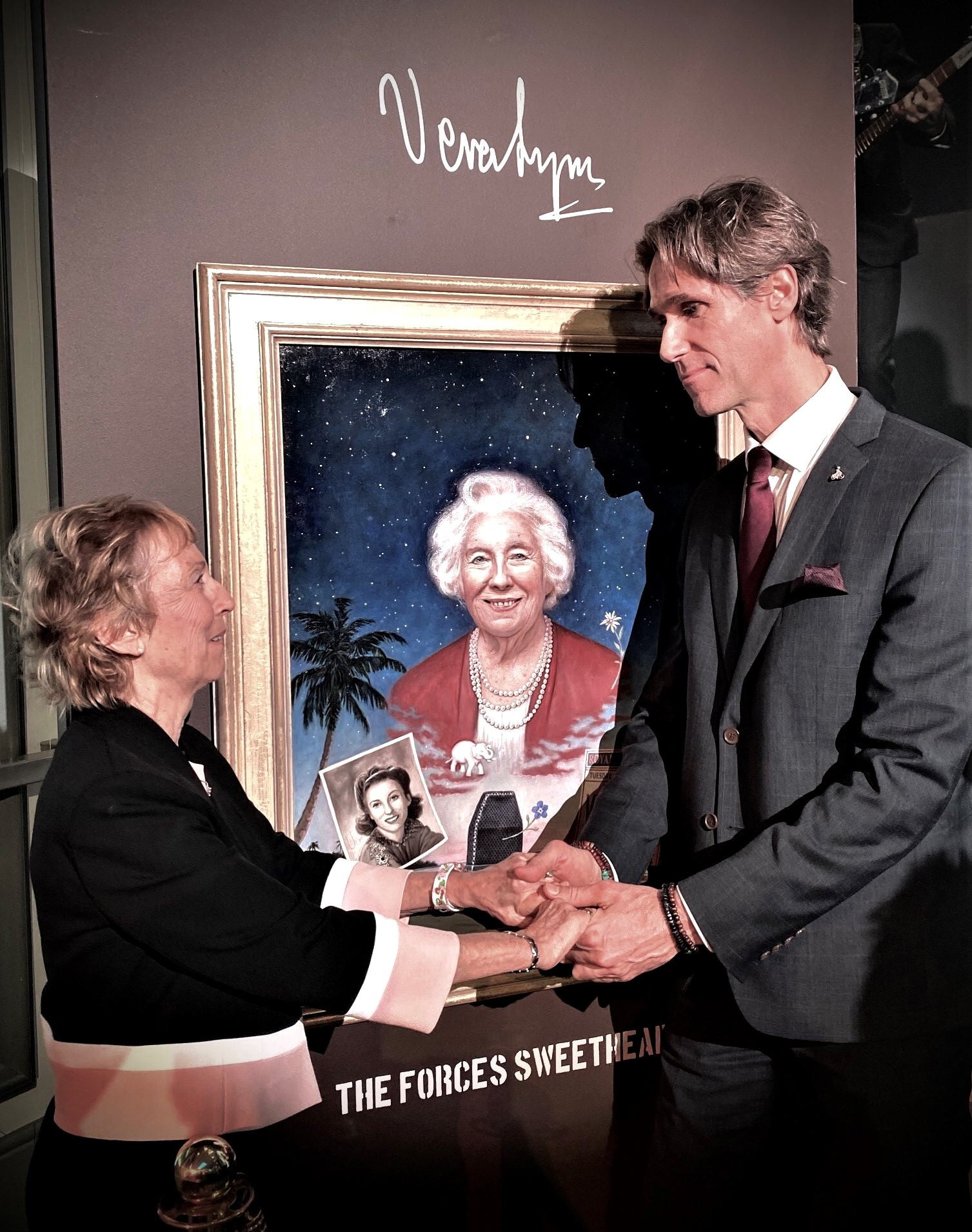
Dame Vera Lynn's daughter Virginia Lewis-Jones and Kolby in front of his portrait of Lynn at the unveiling ceremony at the Royal Albert Hall on 13 January 2020.

In 2013 he produced and appeared in the documentary film And the truth shall make you free about the child abuse in the Catholic Church.

After Anders Behring Breivik’s 2011 Norway attacks in Oslo and at Utoya on 22 July Kolby painted a Yara International bag of artificial fertilizer to debate extremism and the individual's responsibility of using or abusing available technology.

In connection with the celebration of 70 years since the liberation from Nazi-Germany’s occupation of Norway, Kolby in 2015 was commissioned by Samlerhuset to portray Norway's three generations of monarchs attached to the events of WWII, as a gift to Norway's Resistance Museum at Akershus Fortress. He painted Harald V, Olav V and Haakon VII in a triple portrait with the title The Kings of the Liberation.

To the celebrations of the 25th year Consecration Jubilee of the reign of Norway's Harald V and Queen Sonja in 2016 Kolby was commissioned by Samlerhuset in 2016 make a painting as a gift the Crown Regalia Museum in the medieval Archbishop's Palace, Trondheim. He painted the King's and Queen's crowns in a motif with elements symbolizing Norwegian history.

To mark Dame Vera Lynn's contribution to morale and spirit during WWII The London Mint Office in 2019 commissioned Kolby to portray her. The painting was unveiled at the Royal Albert Hall in 2020.

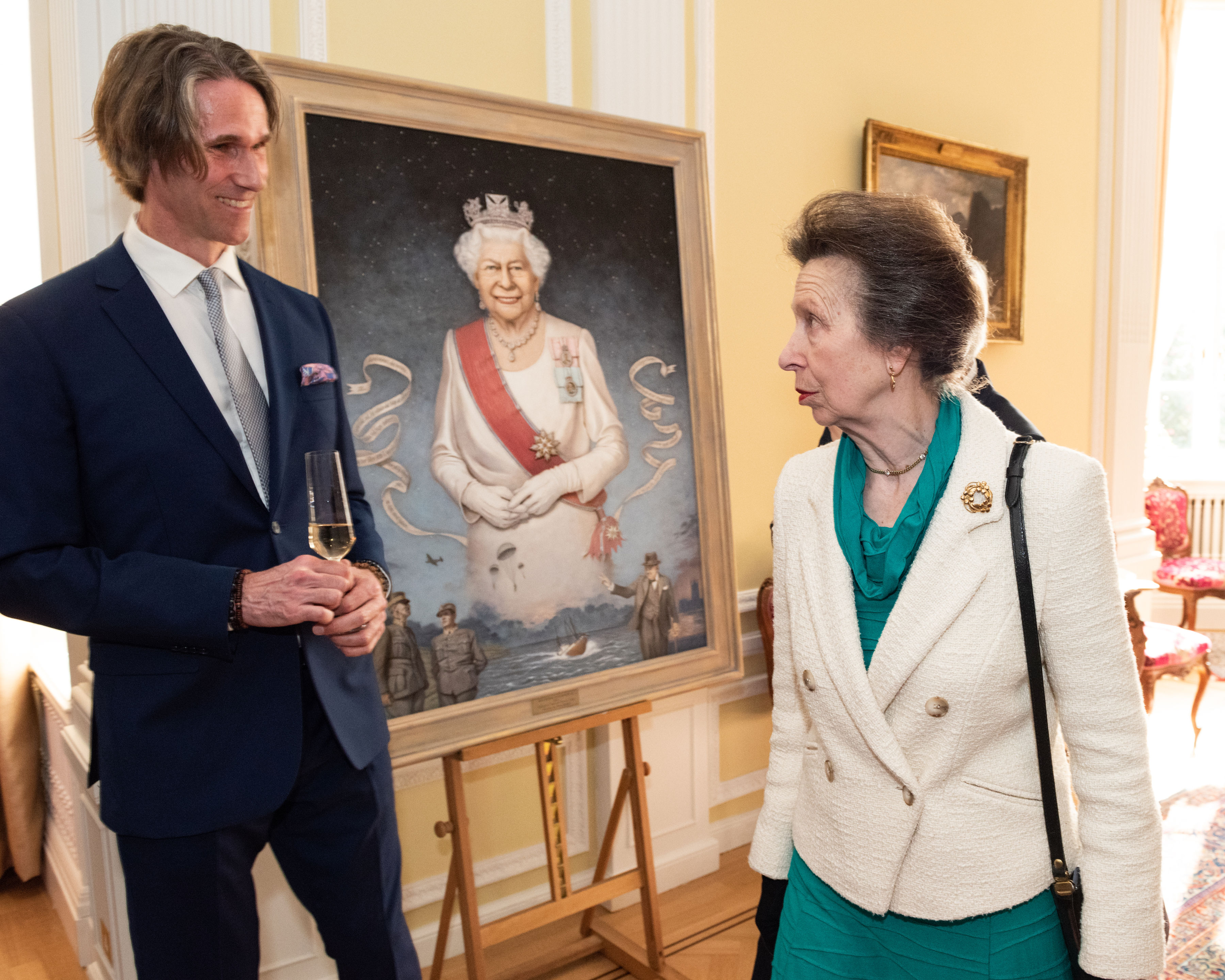
Princess Anne and Kolby in front of his portrait of Queen Elizabeth II.

In connection with the celebration of 75 years since the end of WWII in 2020 Special Forces Club commissioned Kolby to paint a portrait of Elizabeth II. The portrait was to mark the WWII bonds between Great Britain and Norway and was gifted to the Norwegian Ministry of Foreign Affairs. It was presented by Princess Anne at a ceremony in 2022 at the Norwegian Ambassador's residence in London, where it is on permanent display.

== Controversy ==
Kolby received death threats in 1997 when about to exhibit his historical painting The murder of Pope John Paul I in Oslo and withdrew the painting from the show.
