= The Squadronaires =

- Origin: United Kingdom
- Genres: Big band; jazz
- Years active: 1939–1964; 1985–present
- Label: Various

The Squadronaires is a Royal Air Force band which began and performed in Britain during and after the Second World War. The official title of the band was 'The Royal Air Force Dance Orchestra', but it was always known by the more popular title "The Squadronaires".

== History ==
In 1939, the Royal Air Force implemented a plan to raise morale and entertain the troops during wartime, and The Squadronaires was one of the bands organized as a result. The band drew from some of the best musicians of the day. It became a popular dance band and likely the best known of the British military dance bands of the time, with hits like "There's Something in the Air" and "South Rampart Street Parade." The Squadronaires played at dances and concerts for service personnel, and also broadcast on the BBC and recorded on the Decca label. The orchestra first broadcast in January 1941.

After D-Day, the Squadronaires went on to entertain service personnel engaged in the Northwest European campaign but had to return to Britain because of military operations. After demobilization, the members formed a civilian band of the same name. Ronnie Aldrich had been the arranger and co-piano player, but in 1951 he took over as bandleader, and the band was then billed as Ronnie Aldrich and The Squadronaires. Syd Dale replaced him as pianist and also helped with the arrangements. The touring season of 1951 was the busiest period of activity the band had ever experienced. In 1952, The Squadronaires began a regular summer engagement at The Palace Ballroom in Douglas, Isle of Man which continued until 1963. They played in the Ballroom every night except Sundays when they played concerts in the Palace Theatre. A cut-down version of the band (The Squadronetes), compared by vocalist Peter Morton, appeared every afternoon in the Palace Gardens (1960–1962). The Squadronaires continued to work together under Ronnie Aldrich until 1964.

== Members ==
Many of the members formerly played as side men in Bert Ambrose's band. During the war the members were:

- Leader: Jimmy Miller
- Manager: Arthur Maden
- Trumpet: Tommy McQuater, Archie Craig, Clinton French
- Trombone: George Chisholm, Eric Breeze
- Saxophones: Tommy Bradbury, Harry Lewis, Jimmy Durrant, Andy McDevitt, Cliff Townshend, Maurice Stokes
- Piano: Ronnie Aldrich
- Guitar: Sid Colin
- Bass: Arthur Maden
- Drums: Jock Cummings
- Vocals: Jimmy Miller, Joan Regan, Billy Nicholls SNR, Suzy Miller, Jackie Lee, Joan Baxter, Peter Morton, Ken Kirkham, Beryl Davis.

After the war, Jimmy Watson replaced Clinton "Froggy" French on trumpet, and Monty Levy replaced Harry Lewis on alto sax.

== Band revival ==
In 1985, a new big band orchestra was organized under the title "The Royal Air Force Squadronaires." Many original members of the band were contacted and several were present at the official launch of the new band at Headquarters Music Services, RAF Uxbridge, on 8 January 1987. Original band leader Jimmy Miller conducted the band's theme tune, "There's Something in the Air."

Since then the band has recorded Big Band Spectacular and a second album Swing Squadron. To celebrate the 75th anniversary of the formation of the Royal Air Force, the Squadronaires produced an album entitled Squads Away in 1993, and in January 2002, they recorded Flying Home. Recordings from the original band are also available as reissues.

Under band leader Sgt. Jamie Deighton the band has played in Ronnie Scott's Jazz Club in London and for the Prince of Wales at Highgrove House, supporting Pop Idol winner, Will Young. They performed at the 2004 Royal British Legion Festival of Remembrance, also backing Will Young.

In August 2004, the band performed at the Edinburgh International Jazz and Blues Festival, and appeared on television as part of the Edinburgh Military Tattoo. The band performs the majority of its concerts for charity, and in 2004 completed an eight-date tour of the South East to raise money for The Royal Air Forces Association.

== The Civilian Squadronaires ==
In the light of the decision of Ronnie Aldrich to disband the orchestra in 1964, nothing much happened with the Squadronaires Orchestra. At some later time, bandleader Harry Bence approached Aldrich, asking if he could re-form the orchestra. Bence subsequently reformed the 'New' Squadronaires, and ran the band as a commercial unit until his death in 1997. Following Bence's death, the future of the civilian band was in some doubt. Musical arranger and trumpet player Greg Francis then approached Mrs Mary Aldrich (Ronnie's widow) asking if he could obtain her permission to re-form the 'New Squadronaires' as a tribute to the original wartime Dance Band. He wanted to present the band 'as it was then' - with young players, dressed in RAF uniform, but most importantly, playing the music of the era. Mary Aldrich was delighted to offer her kind support in this. And so, the civilian 'New Squadronaires Orchestra' was re-formed in September 1997. It played its inaugural concert on the Isle of Man where the original band had performed for 11 years during the 1950s and 1960s. As the original venues, the Palace Ballrrom and Theatre had long since been redeveloped, the band played the concert at the Villa Marina.

The New Squadronaires Orchestra has since played at thousands of military and non military events, including many of the RAF stations in the UK. It has played at the RAF Museum in Hendon, at Duxford and other airshows, and at the Imperial War Museum in London. Not only this but, the New Squadronaires has played its part in RAF recruitment. In 2002, the orchestra played (in the pouring rain - as they might have during the war) alongside the RAF recruitment exhibition in Blackpool - the very town where the Squadronaires played their first date in 1940. The orchestra was resident at the Blackpool Tower Ballroom for two years, 2001 and 2002, and has remained popular with the many big band enthusiasts and holidaymakers.

In 1997, along with the relaunch of the orchestra, a new CD was issued, featuring transcriptions of some of the original Squadronaires music. The parts were actually thrown on a bonfire by ex-leader Aldrich in 1964, and so, it was necessary for Francis, who is owner of the registered trade mark name (The New Squadronaires Orchestra) to transcribe many of the original titles, from the existing recordings. The CD features amongst other top professional musicians, ex Syd Lawrence saxophonists Norman Brown and Andy Taylor, and also features Francis playing the trumpet features.
