= Hughie Charles =

- Born: Charles Hugh Owen Ferry; 24 July 1907; Manchester, England
- Died: 6 October 1995 (aged 88) Eastbourne, Sussex, England
- Genres: Pop, swing
- Occupation: Songwriter
- Years active: 1930s–1960s

Hughie Charles (24 July 1907 – 6 October 1995), was an English songwriter and producer of musical theatre. Born Charles Hugh Owen Ferry in Manchester, he is best known for co-writing the songs "We'll Meet Again" and "There'll Always Be an England" with Ross Parker.
