= (There'll Be Bluebirds Over) The White Cliffs of Dover =

1941 song

Song
- Published: 1941 by Shapiro, Bernstein & Co.
- Composer: Walter Kent
- Lyricist: Nat Burton

"(There'll Be Bluebirds Over) The White Cliffs of Dover" is a popular American World War II song composed in 1941 by American composer Walter Kent to lyrics by American lyricist Nat Burton. Made famous in the United Kingdom by British singer Vera Lynn's 1942 version, it was one of Lynn's best-known recordings and among the most popular World War II tunes.

== Background ==
The song was written about a year after the start of the Battle of Britain, which saw the Royal Air Force and German Luftwaffe fighting in the skies over the United Kingdom, including the white cliffs of Dover in Southern England. Nazi Germany had conquered much of Europe and in 1941 was still bombing the UK. With neither the United States nor the Soviet Union having joined the war against Germany and her allies, the UK was the only major power fighting the Axis powers in Europe (see The Darkest Hour). The American lyricist, Nat Burton, wrote his lyric (perhaps unaware that the bluebird does not occur in the UK, though the migrant swallow 'bluebird' is a well-known British harbinger of spring) and asked Kent to set it to music. Notable phrases include "Thumbs Up!", which was an RAF and Royal Canadian Air Force term for permission to go, and "flying in those angry skies" where the air war was taking place.

The lyrics looked toward a time when the war would be over, and peace would rule over the iconic white cliffs, the UK's symbolic border with the European mainland.

The full song includes two verses rarely found in recordings:

I'll never forget the people I met braving those angry skies.
I remember well as the shadows fell, the light of hope in their eyes.
And tho' I'm far away, I can still hear them say "Thumbs Up!"
for when the dawn comes up,... There'll be blue birds over...

When night shadows fall, I'll always recall out there across the sea
Twilight falling down on some little town;
It's fresh in my memory.
I hear mother pray, and to her baby say "Don't cry,"
This is her lullaby.... There'll be blue birds over...

== World War II performances ==
While in the United Kingdom the song was made famous by Vera Lynn, and sung by her to troops during the war, in the United States, "The White Cliffs of Dover" was first recorded by the Glenn Miller Orchestra in late 1941. Miller's version placed 10th on the Billboard Popularity Chart for the week ending Dec. 26, 1941, which was just 19 days after the attack on Pearl Harbor. By January 1942, however, a version performed by Kay Kyser and His Orchestra, with Harry Babbitt providing the vocals, supplanted Miller's version on the charts. The song remained in the top 10 for several months, with the public's favorite going back and forth between Miller and Kyser each week.

Singer Kate Smith's version of the song, also recorded in 1941, made it into the top 10 as well at No. 9 in February 1942. Other versions by Sammy Kaye (No. 11) and Jimmy Dorsey (No 15) also made the Top 20 in 1942.

Jimmie Baker frequently performed it in Europe during the war, and the song was sung by the vocal group The King's Men on a 3 February 1942 episode of the Fibber McGee and Molly Show. Ray Eberle and Tex Beneke also included it in their repertoires.

In 1944, a version was recorded by Louis Prima and His Orchestra. This version reached No. 9 on the Harlem Hit Parade chart.

== Later performances ==
The Checkers, an American group, released an R&B version of the song in 1953 which became very popular. Other artists who have recorded the song include Connie Francis, Bing Crosby, Ray Conniff, Jim Reeves, Acker Bilk, The Righteous Brothers (a hit in the UK Singles Chart), Steeleye Span, Bert Kaempfert and The Hot Sardines on their debut album released in 2014.

In 1995, British pop duo Robson & Jerome recorded the song as part of a double A-side release, coupled with "Unchained Melody"; the single stayed at No. 1 for seven weeks in the UK Singles Chart, selling over a million copies and also making it the number one song with the longest title, including brackets. The Jive Aces released a swing version in 2005 (similar to Acker Bilk's arrangement).

On 18 February 2009, a story in The Daily Telegraph announced that Dame Vera Lynn was suing the British National Party (BNP) for using her version of "The White Cliffs of Dover" on an anti-immigration album without her permission. Lynn's lawyer claimed sales of the song would help boost the BNP's coffers and would link her name to the party's far-right views by association.

On 12 October 2009, Ian Hislop presented a half-hour BBC Radio 4 programme about the song.

On 9 May 2015, Elaine Paige performed the song at VE Day 70: A Party to Remember at Horse Guards Parade in London.

Great American Songbook singer Sarah Spiegel released a cover version on her 2020 album As Time Goes By.
