= We'll Meet Again =

1939 song by Hughie Charles and Ross Parker

- Sheet music cover

Song
- Published: 1939 by Michael Ross Limited
- Recorded: September 28, 1939
- Genre: Traditional pop
- Songwriters: Ross Parker, Hughie Charles

"We'll Meet Again" is a 1939 song with music and lyrics composed and written by English songwriters Ross Parker and Hughie Charles. It was first recorded on September 28, 1939 by English singer Dame Vera Margaret Lewis, better known as Vera Lynn, with Arthur Young. The song is one of the most famous of the World War II era, resonating with servicemen going off to fight as well as their families and loved ones.

== Background and composition ==
The song was published by Michael Ross Limited, whose directors included Louis Carris, Ross Parker and Norman Keen. Keen, an English pianist, collaborated with Parker and Hughie Charles on "We'll Meet Again", as well as many other songs published by the company, including "There'll Always Be an England" and "I'm In Love For The Last Time".

It was initially written in the key of D major, and set to a tempo of 92 BPM. The original recording featured Lynn accompanied by Arthur Young on Hammond Novachord, an early electronic keyboard, while a re-recording in 1953 featured a more lavish instrumentation and a chorus of British Armed Forces personnel.

== Legacy after World War II ==
During the Cold War, Lynn's recording was included in the package of music and programmes held in 20 underground radio stations of the BBC's Wartime Broadcasting Service (WTBS), designed to provide public information and morale-boosting broadcasts for 100 days after a nuclear attack. The song reached number 29 on the U.S. charts in 1954.

Lynn sang the song in London on the 60th anniversary of VE Day in 2005 alongside Petula Clark and Bruce Forsyth.

In April 2020, a charity duet with Katherine Jenkins, released in 2014, reached number 72 on the UK Singles Chart, with proceeds going to National Health Service (NHS) charities. Following the 75th anniversary celebrations of VE Day in May 2020, the solo version by Lynn also reached number 55 in the UK chart.

== Use in media ==
The song inspired and gave its name to the 1943 musical film We'll Meet Again, where Lynn stars in a loose adaptation of her life as a "forces' sweetheart" during the war.

Lynn's 1953 recording is featured in the final scene of Stanley Kubrick's 1964 film Dr. Strangelove with a bitter irony, as the song accompanies a nuclear holocaust that wipes out humanity.

The song was covered by the American folk rock band The Byrds as the last track on their debut album Mr. Tambourine Man.

The song is used in the closing scenes of the 1986 BBC television serial The Singing Detective.

In the 2012 Disney Channel and Disney XD animated series Gravity Falls, villain Bill Cipher sings this song to Ford Pines during the series finale.

== Cultural impact ==
- The song has been credited as one of the first to make use of the Hammond Novachord, the first polyphonic synthesizer.
- Traditionally, this song is played on 5 May as a closure to the Liberation Day Concert in Amsterdam, to mark the end of World War II in the Netherlands.
- In 2024, the piece was performed by the South Netherlands Philharmonic at the Netherlands American Cemetery. "We'll Meet Again" closed the programme, which commemorated the 80th anniversary of The Netherlands' liberation.
- On 5 April 2020, Queen Elizabeth II referenced the song in a rare televised address that aired to Britain and the Commonwealth, where she expressed her gratitude for the efforts people are taking to mitigate the COVID-19 pandemic virus and acknowledged the severe challenges being faced by families across the world. The reference spurred covers by West End theatre stars with Lynn and Katherine Jenkins just some months before Lynn died. Jenkins' version was released on iTunes as a benefit for the NHS Charities Together.
- The song is one of several played in the waiting queue of the Tower of Terror ride at Walt Disney World and Disneyland Paris.
- During the series finale of The Colbert Report, dozens of past guests of the show returned to sing the song together.
- The Pink Floyd song "Vera", from The Wall (1979), references lyrics of "We'll Meet Again" as well as Lynn herself.

== Bibliography ==
- Baade, Christina L. (2012). Victory Through Harmony: The BBC and Popular Music in World War II. USA: Oxford University Press. ISBN 978-0-19-537201-4 – via Google Books.
- Maconie, Stuart (6 June 2013). The People's Songs: The Story of Modern Britain in 50 Records. Random House. ISBN 978-1-4090-3318-9 – via Google Books.
- Savage, Mark (18 June 2020). "We'll Meet Again: The story of Dame Vera Lynn's wartime classic". BBC. Archived from the original on 18 July 2024.
