= Hengler =

Hengler is a surname. Notable people with the surname include:

- Frederick Charles Hengler (1820–1887), British circus proprietor
- Jenny Hengler (1849– c. 1892), British equestrian performer
- Lorenz Hengler (1806–1858), German priest and inventor of the horizontal pendulum
- Sarah Hengler (c. 1765–1845), British businesswoman and firework artist
