= Henzler =

Henzler is a German surname. Notable people with the surname include:

- Simon Henzler (born 1976), German footballer and coach
- Wolf Henzler (born 1975), German racing driver

== See also ==
- Hendler
- Hengler
