= Tivoli Gardens =

Amusement park and pleasure garden in Copenhagen, Denmark

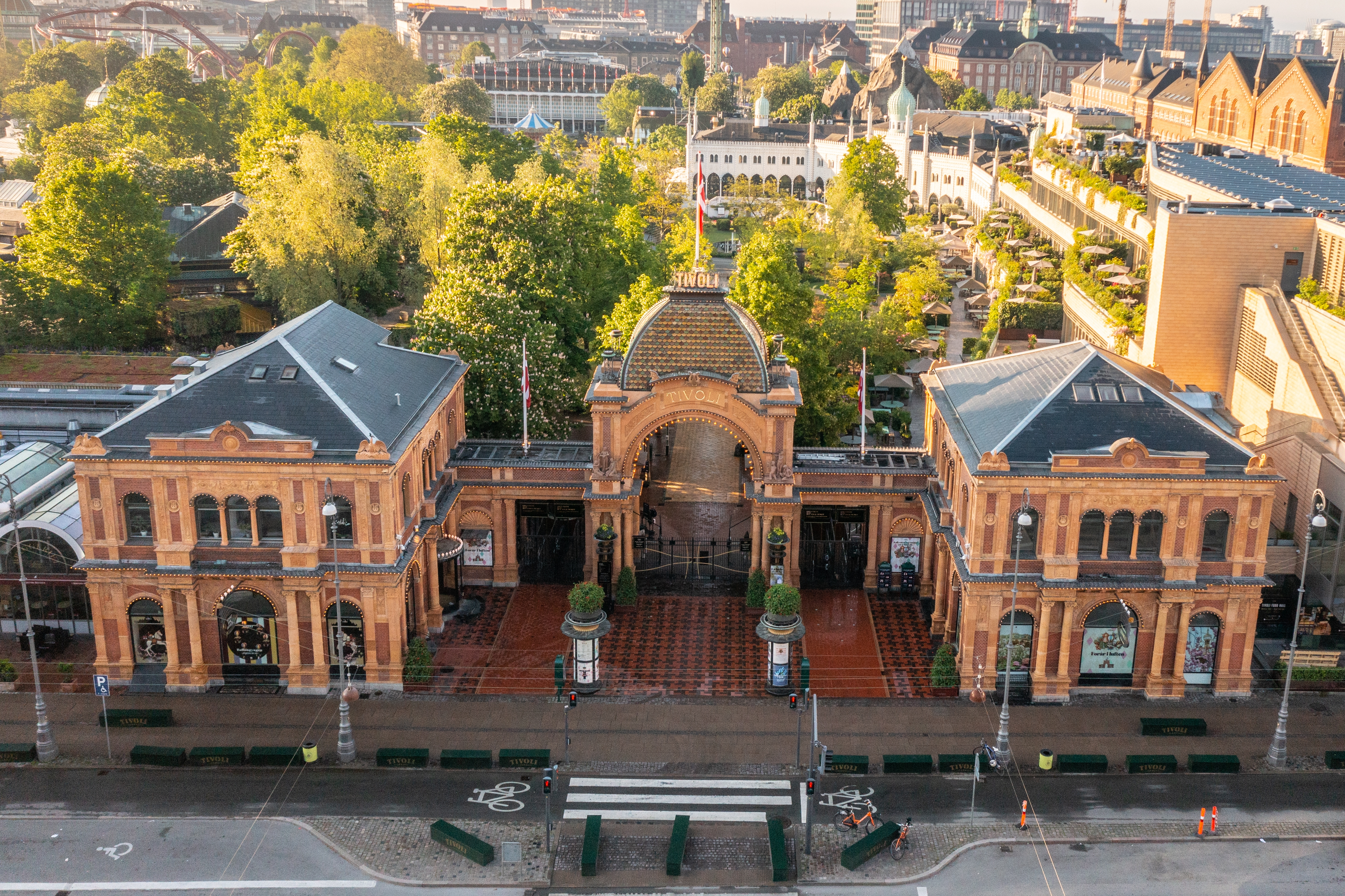
- The entrance to Tivoli
- Interactive map of Tivoli Gardens
- Location: Copenhagen, Denmark
- Coordinates: 55°40′25″N 12°34′06″E
- Public transit: Copenhagen Central Station
- Opened: 15 August 1843; 183 years ago
- Owner: Tivoli A/S
- Operated by: Tivoli A/S
- General manager: Susanne Mørch Koch (since 1 September 2020)
- Attendance: 4.25 million in 2024

Attractions
- Total: 25
- Roller coasters: 4
- Water rides: 2
- Website: www.tivoli.dk

Tivoli Gardens, also known simply as Tivoli (Danish pronunciation: [ˈtsʰiwoli]), is an amusement park and pleasure garden in Copenhagen, Denmark. The park opened on 15 August 1843 and is the second-oldest operating amusement park in the world, after Dyrehavsbakken in nearby Klampenborg, also in Denmark.

With 4.25 million visitors in 2024, Tivoli is the most visited amusement park in Scandinavia and second-most popular seasonal amusement park in the world after Europa-Park. Tivoli is also the fifth-most visited amusement park in Europe, behind Disneyland Park, Efteling, Europa-Park and Walt Disney Studios Park. It is located in downtown Copenhagen, next to the Central rail station.

== History ==
The amusement park was first called "Tivoli & Vauxhall"; "Tivoli" alluding to the Jardin de Tivoli in Paris (which in its turn had been named after Tivoli near Rome, Italy), and "Vauxhall" alluding to Vauxhall Gardens in London. It is mentioned in various books, such as Number the Stars by Lois Lowry, and was also used prominently in the 1961 science fiction film Reptilicus.

Tivoli's founder, Georg Carstensen (b. 1812 – d. 1857), obtained a five-year charter to create Tivoli by telling King Christian VIII that "when the people are amusing themselves, they do not think about politics". The monarch granted Carstensen use of roughly 15 acres (61,000 m^{2}) of the fortified glacis outside Vesterport (the West Gate) for an annual rent. Until the 1850s Tivoli was outside the city, accessible from the city only through the Vesterport.

From its beginning Tivoli included a variety of attractions: buildings in the style of an imaginary Orient: a theatre, band stands, restaurants and cafés, flower gardens, and mechanical amusement rides such as a merry-go-round and a primitive scenic railway. After dark, colored lamps illuminated the gardens. On certain evenings, specially designed fireworks could be seen reflected in Tivoli's lake, a remnant of the moat surrounding the city fortifications.

Composer Hans Christian Lumbye (b. 1810 – d. 1874) was Tivoli's musical director from 1843 to 1872. Lumbye was inspired by Viennese waltz composers such as the Strauss family (Johann Strauss I and his sons), and became known as the "Strauss of the North". Many of his compositions are specifically inspired by the gardens, including "Salute to the Ticket Holders of Tivoli", "Carnival Joys" and "A Festive Night at Tivoli". The Tivoli Symphony Orchestra still performs many of his works.

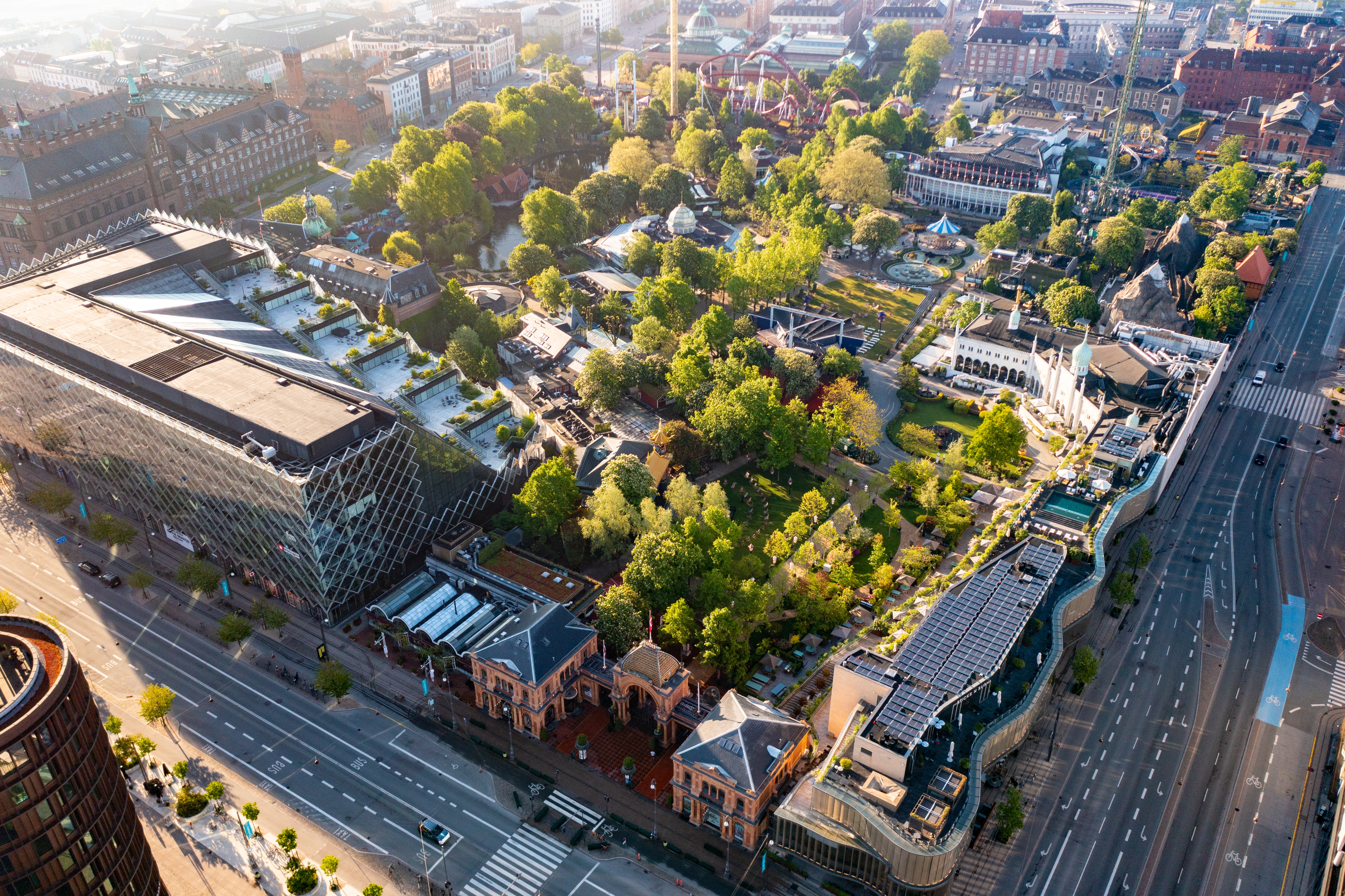
Aerial photo of the park

In 1874, a Chinese-style Pantomimeteatret (pantomime theatre) took the place of an older smaller theatre. The audience stands in the open, the stage being inside the building. The theatre's "curtain" is a mechanical peacock's tail. From the very beginning, the theatre was the home of Italian pantomimes, introduced in Denmark by the Italian Giuseppe Casorti. This tradition, dependent on the Italian Commedia dell'Arte, has been kept alive; it portrays the characters Cassander (the old father), Columbine (his beautiful daughter), Harlequin (her lover), and the stupid servant Pierrot. The absence of spoken dialogue is advantageous due to Tivoli's status as a tourist attraction.

In the late 19th and early 20th century, Tivoli also hosted human exhibitions.

In 1943, Nazi sympathisers burnt many of Tivoli's buildings, including the concert hall, to the ground. Temporary buildings were constructed in their place and the park was back in operation after a few weeks.

During World War II, several landmarks within Tivoli Gardens were bombed by Nazi saboteurs in June 1944, including sections of Rutschebanen. Government officials believed it was essential to restore the park back to operating order as soon as possible, so Rutschebanen was renovated and reopened just 25 days later.

Georg Carstensen said in 1844: "Tivoli will never, so to speak, be finished", a sentiment echoed just over a century later when Walt Disney said of his own Tivoli-inspired theme park, "Disneyland will never be completed. It will continue to grow as long as there is imagination left in the world".

In Danish, Icelandic, Norwegian, Finnish and Swedish, the word tivoli has become synonymous with any amusement park.

== Rides ==
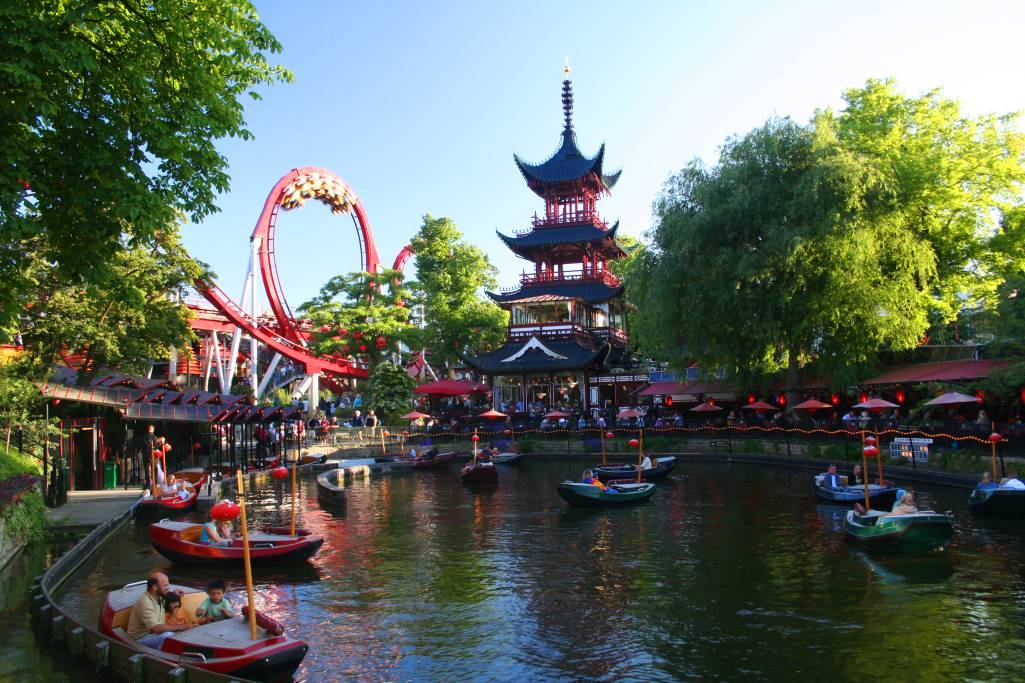
Dragon Boat lake and Dæmonen roller coaster in the background

The park is best known for its wooden roller coaster, Rutschebanen, or as some people call it, Bjergbanen (The Mountain Coaster), built in 1914. It is one of the world's oldest wooden roller coasters that is still operating today. An operator controls the ride by braking so that it does not gain too much speed during descent of the hills. It is an ACE Coaster Classic.

Another roller coaster, Dæmonen (The Demon) features an Immelmann loop, a vertical loop, and a zero-G roll all during the ride time of just one minute and forty six seconds. An old roller coaster, Slangen (The Snake) was removed to have enough space for Dæmonen. In 2017, Tivoli Gardens added an optional virtual reality experience to the ride, simulating a flight through ancient China, along with encounters with dragons and demons. Dæmonen is situated next to the concert hall.

A well-known swing ride, The Star Flyer, opened in Tivoli in 2006. 260 feet (80 metres) high and built by the Austria-based Australian company Funtime, it offers panoramic views of the city.

On 1 May 2009, Tivoli Gardens opened the new ride Vertigo, a looping plane ride where the rider pilots the ride, able to control the plane. This ride had extremely low capacity and suffered significant downtime. The ride was removed in 2021.

A Zamperla Air Race ride, Aquila, opened on 11 April 2013. It is a giant swing and spinner with centrifugal powers up to 4 g, named after the constellation of the Eagle.

The newest attractions include Fatamorgana and Tik Tak. Fatamorgana opened in 2016. This is the world's first Condor 2GH, which offers two separate seating arrangements, one milder version with two-seater gondolas, and a thrilling version in which riders are slung around at high speed while seated in a ring and facing away from the center.

Tik Tak opened in 2018 and is the first permanent installation of a Mondial Shake R5. This model is slightly less aggressive than the traveling model and is spectacularly themed.

=== Roller coasters ===
| Ride name | Type | Opened in | Manufacturer | Additional information |
|---|---|---|---|---|
| Kamelen (The Camel Trail) | Steel sit down | 2019 | Zierer | Reaches a speed of 26 km/h (16 mph) on a 60.2 m (198 ft) long track and a height of 3.3 m (11 ft); age limit 2 years old. Small Tivoli model, train 2x6. This replaced Caravanen which operated from 1974 until 2018. Kamelen follows the same layout but with new track and a new train. |
| Dæmonen (The Demon) | Steel floorless | 2004 | Bolliger & Mabillard | Reaches a speed of 77.2 km/h (48.0 mph) on a 564 m-long (1,850 ft) track and a height of 28 m (92 ft) with 3 inversions (loop, Immelmann, zero g-roll); height limit 1.32 m. Floorless Custom Coaster, train 4x6. The ride operated with virtual reality from 2017 until 2020 (possibly due to COVID-19 for hygiene reasons). |
| Mælkevejen (The Milky Way) | Powered | 2019 | Mack Rides | Reaches a speed of 36 km/h (22 mph) on a 312 m-long (1,024 ft) track; age limit 2 years old. Custom Powered Coaster. It replaced the Odinexpressen, which closed in 2018 to allow it to be built in its place, with a slightly longer layout but significantly reduced speed. |
| Rutschebanen (The Roller Coaster) | Wooden sit down | 1914 | Valdemar Lebech | This classic coaster reaches a speed of 50 km/h (31 mph) on a 720 m-long (2,360 ft) track and a height of 12 m (39 ft). Themed around a mountain, train 2x12. |

=== Other rides ===
- Aquila – giant swing and spinner ride that opened in 2013; with centrifugal powers up to 4 g; height limit 1.2 m. Zamperla.
- The Bumper Cars – classic bumper cars that date from 1926.
- Fatamorgana – a 141 ft (43 m) tall hybrid Condor ride that opened in 2016. Huss.
- The Balloon Swing (Ballongyngen) – Ferris wheel which opened during WWII in 1943.
- The Flying Suitcase (Den Flyvende Kuffert) – a 7-minute H.C. Andersen-inspired dark ride that opened in 1993 and was renovated in 2010. Mack Rides.
- The Galley Ships – roundabout boats that opened in 1937.
- The Golden Tower – Turbo Drop tower that opened in 1999; height 207 ft (63 m). S&S Worldwide.
- The Mine (Minen) – dark ride in a boat that opened in 2003; this 200 meters long mine-themed ride has a 2 m drop. Mack Rides.
- The Monsoon (Monsunen) – giant swing, a magic carpet ride that opened in 2001; height limit 1.4 m. Zierer.
- The Skyship (Himmelskibet) – an 260 ft (80 m) tall sky flyer that opened in 2006; height limit 1.2 m. Funtime.
- The Swing Carousel – swing ride used at Halloween and Christmas.
- Tik Tak – A spinner ride that opened in the summer 2018; Visitors are 'thrown through time and space', rotated both vertically and horizontally at high speed, while being exposed to forces approaching 4G. Mondial (Shake R5)

=== Children's rides ===
- The Astronomer (Astronomen) – space-themed roundabout boats that opened in 2017.
- The Blue Sapphire (Den blå Safir) – mini Ferris wheel that opened in 1970.
- The Animal Carousel (Dyrekarrusellen) – classic carousel from 1920.
- The Dragon Boats (Dragebådene) – pilot your own boat on the water, opened in 1936.
- The Elf Train – train ride.
- The Fun House – house of fun.
- The Lighthouse – air carousel that opened in 2010. Zamperla.
- The Little Dragon – swing ride.
- The Little Pilot – airplanes that opened in 1990. Remodelled/redesigned into 'The Little Dragon' in 2013 as a part of the reopening of the Merry Corner.
- The Music Carousel – carousel.
- Minimorgana – mini bumper cars that opened in 2016.
- The Panda (Pandaen) – mini drop tower that opened in 2000. S&S Sansei .
- The Star Tower – Children's 'drop tower' opened in 2013 as a part of the reopening of the Merry Corner, Zamperla.
- The Temple Tower – pull-yourself-up tower ride that opened in 2000. Heege.
- The Vintage Cars – on-track cars that opened in 1959.
- The Wood Carousel – wooden carousel.

=== Former attractions ===
- Vertigo – (Permanently closed as of July 5, 2021) giant swing that opened in 2009; height limit 1.4 m. Technical Park. This looping plane ride reaches a speed of 100 km/h (62 mph) and a height of 98 feet (30 metres).
- Snurretoppen - Huss Breakdance
- Dragon - Huss Flic Flac
- Original Rutchebane

=== Other attractions ===
- The Pantomime Theater has free pantomime shows.
- The Tivoli Guard Boys stars boys age 9 – 16 who perform music at the park.
- Tivoli Aquarium – located below ground level inside The Concert Hall, entrance is at extra charge.
- Amusement Arcades – extra charge.
- Tivoli Jackpot – cash prizes, extra charge.
- Tivoli Festival – takes place from 14 May to 8 September and features more than 50 different events that include opera shows, symphony concerts, chamber music, pop and rock artists, and much more. On Fridays at 10 pm there is a weekly rock concert under the banner Friday Rock.
- The Concert Hall – there has been a concert hall at the park since day one; the current concert hall was built in 1956 and seats 1660 guests. It was renovated in 1985 and the Rotunda was added then. Extra charge music concerts and shows.
- The Glass Hall Theater – the current Glass Hall was built in 1946, following the destruction of the old one in 1944 during the Nazi occupation of Denmark. the hall features all kinds of music events as well as theater shows for kids. Extra charge.
- The Harmony Pavilion – occasionally music performances throughout the year and special events.
- Open Air Stage – this open-air stage hosts both music performances and other kind of shows.
- Promenade Pavilion – occasionally music performances throughout the year and special events.
- Montebello – In 1891 Tivoli purchased a large yellow hot air balloon for a new attraction. It was filled with hydrogen, and the basket could carry up to 15 people at a time.

In addition, there is a Halloween Fest in October and Christmas Holidays in December. During the summer the park has fireworks shows each Saturday. In 2022 the firework season runs from June 4 to September 24, and the firework will take place on the roof of The Concert Hall to the tones of The Barber of Seville by Gioachino Rossini.

=== Hotels ===
The Nimb Hotel is the only hotel located on-site at the park. The Tivoli Hotel & Congress Centre is affiliated with Tivoli Gardens only by name, but close cooperation does take place. Many of the interior designs were created by Thomas Winkler, chief artist at the Tivoli Gardens since 2009.

== Performing arts ==
Besides the rides, Tivoli Gardens also serve as a venue for various performing arts & as an active part of the cultural scene in Copenhagen.

=== Tivoli Concert Hall ===
Tivoli Concert Hall is a classical concert hall featuring concerts with some of the largest names in international classical music.

=== The Pantomime Theatre ===
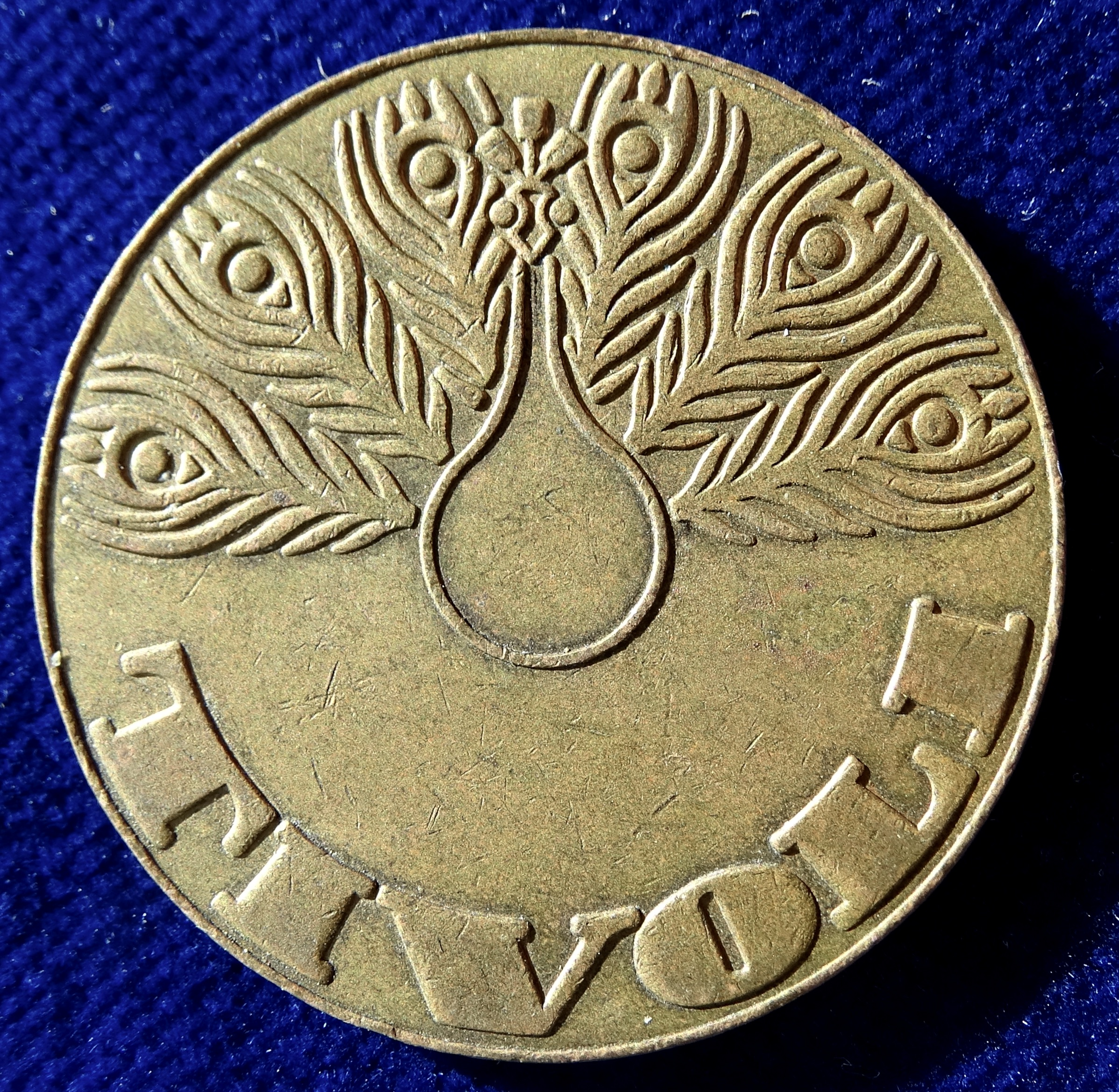
Pantomime Theatre admission token showing the tail of a peacock

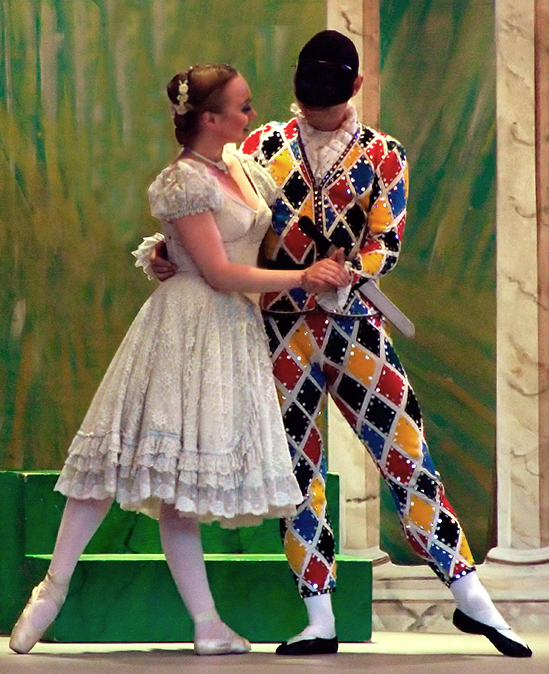
Harlekin and Columbine at The Pantomime Theatre

The Pantomime Theatre is an open-air theatre designed by Vilhelm Dahlerup, also known for the design of the Royal Danish Theatre. It is a toy-like historicist built in Chinese style and noted for its mechanical front curtain that takes five men to operate and unfolds like a peacock's tail. As indicated by the name, it is primarily a scene for pantomime theatre in the classical Italian commedia dell'arte tradition, which is performed daily with a live pit orchestra. Besides this original function, the theatre leads a second life as a venue for ballet and modern dance, performing works by choreographers such as August Bournonville, Dinna Bjørn, Louise Midjord and Paul James Rooney.

=== The Tivoli Youth Guard ===
The Tivoli Youth Guard is a formation of boys and girls aged 8–16 dressed in uniforms reminiscent of those of the Royal Danish Guard complete with bearskins. It was founded in 1844 and gives concerts, makes parades, stands guard at the garden's buildings and monuments at special occasions and represents the gardens at various events. It is composed of a Corps of drums, a military-styled marching band and an honor guard platoon.

=== Pop and jazz music ===
During the warmer summer months, Tivoli also features a live music series dubbed Fredagsrock (Friday Rock), which in the past has featured Roxette, the Smashing Pumpkins, Sting, the Beach Boys, Pet Shop Boys, Kanye West and 5 Seconds of Summer, and also popular Danish acts such as TV-2, Nephew, Hanne Boel, Raveonettes and Thomas Helmig.

During the Copenhagen Jazz Festival, Tivoli Gardens is one of the many Copenhagen localities that serve as venues for concerts.

== Gallery ==
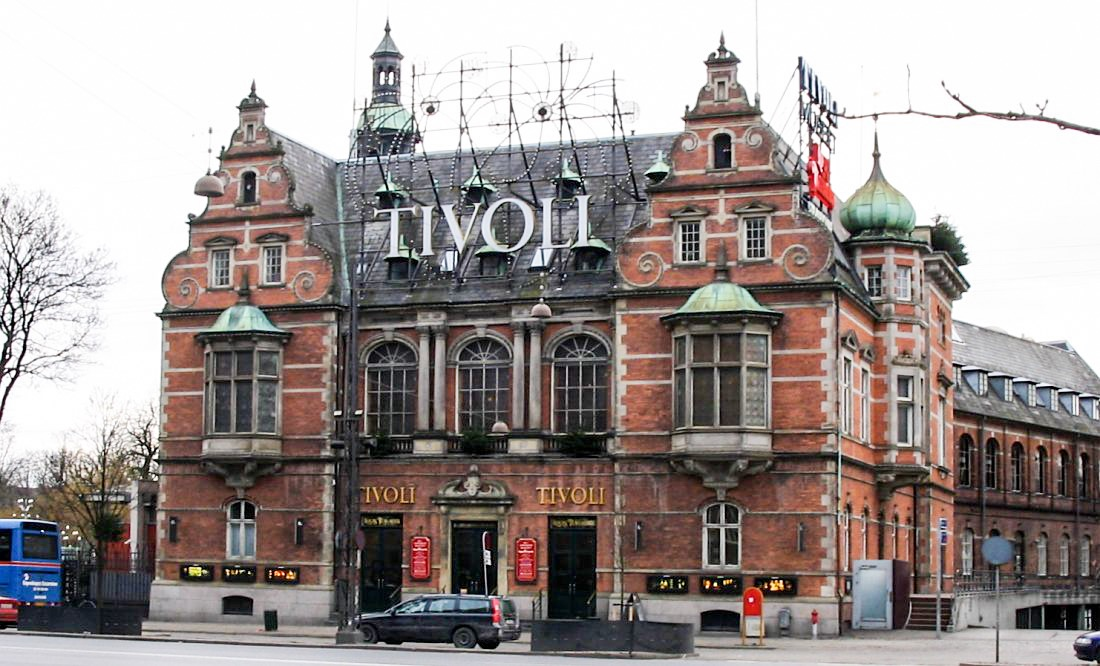
The H.C. Andersen castle

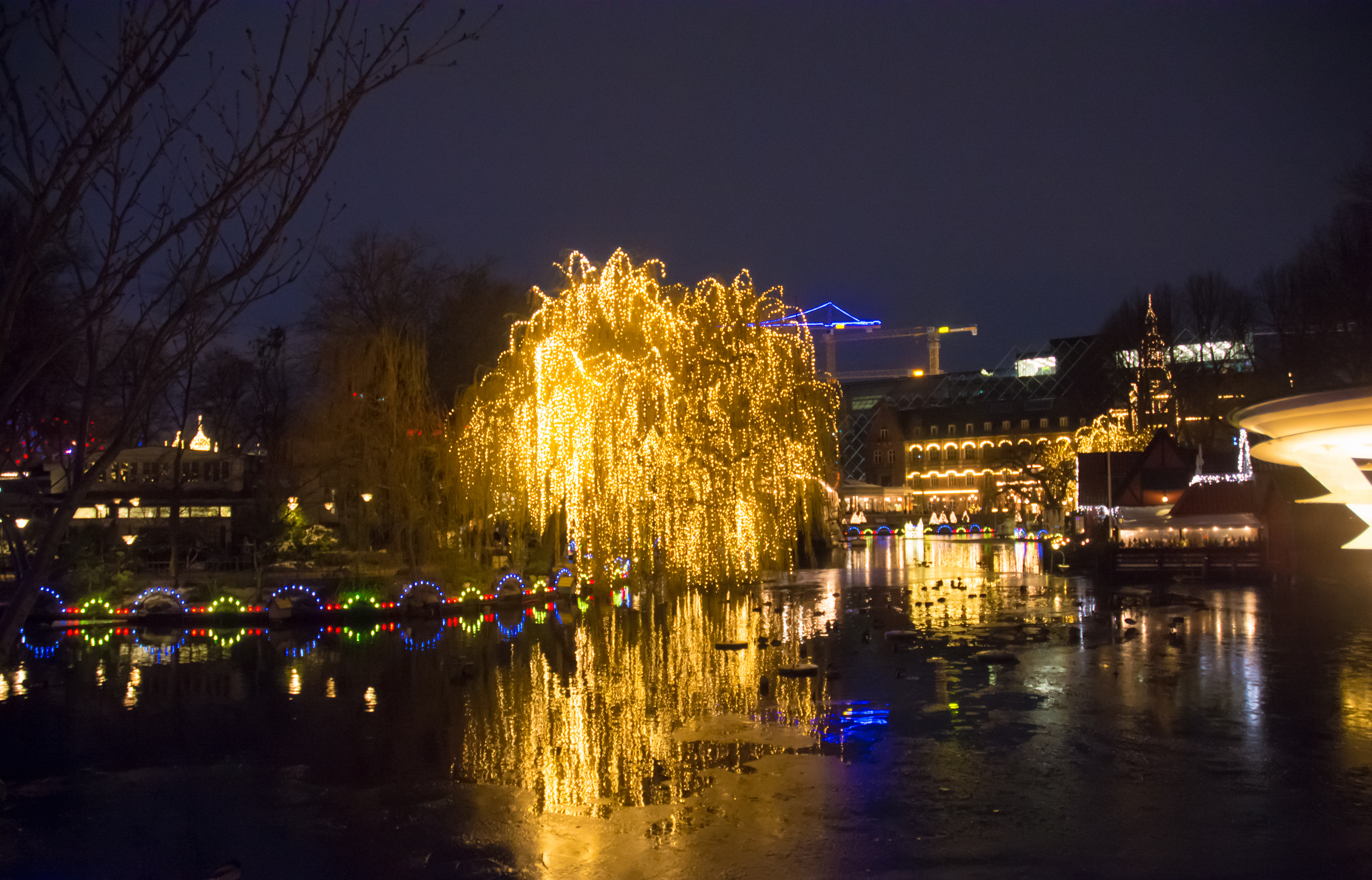
A view of the illuminated gardens on a December night

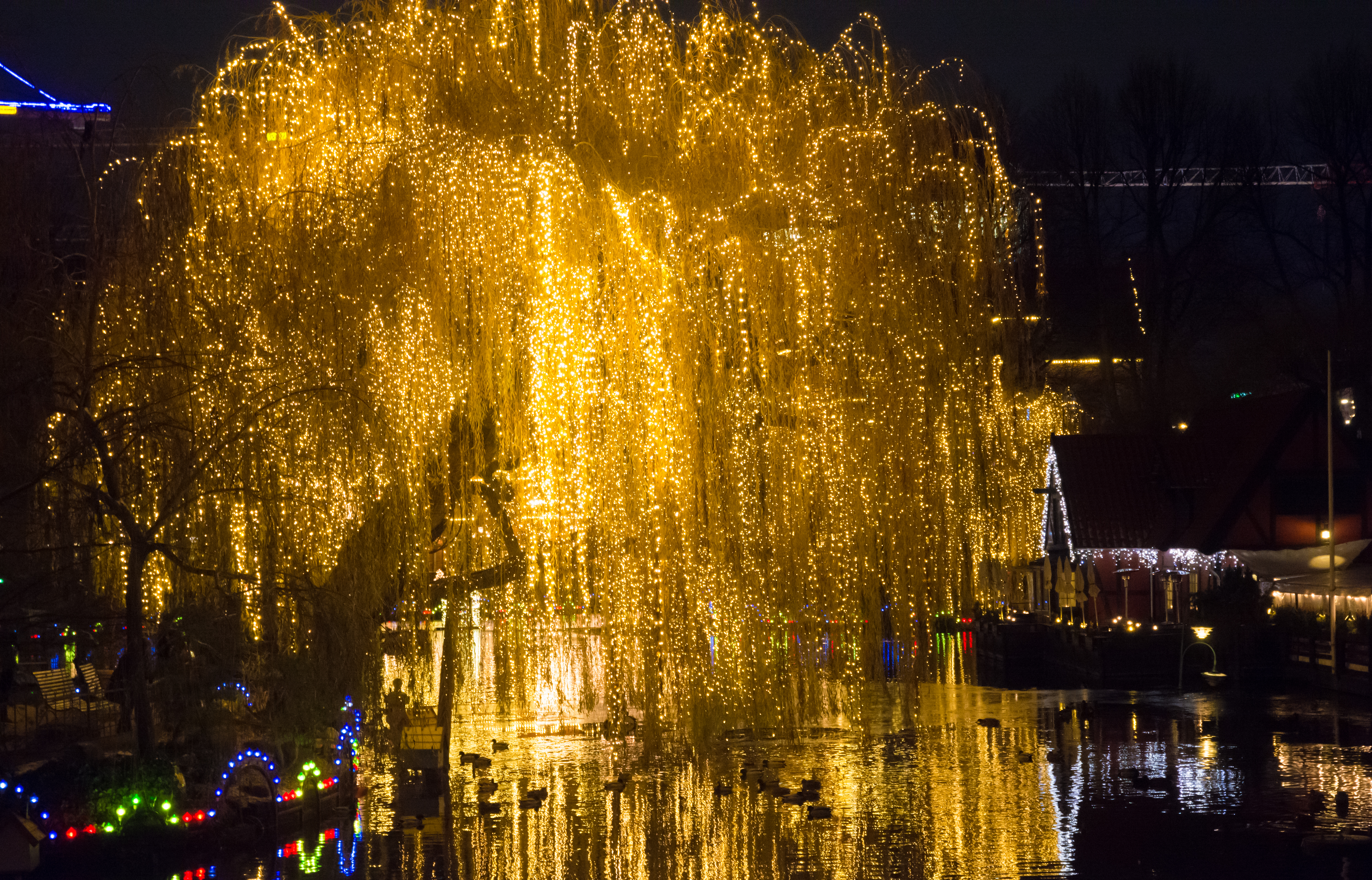
Tivoli Gardens lake tree

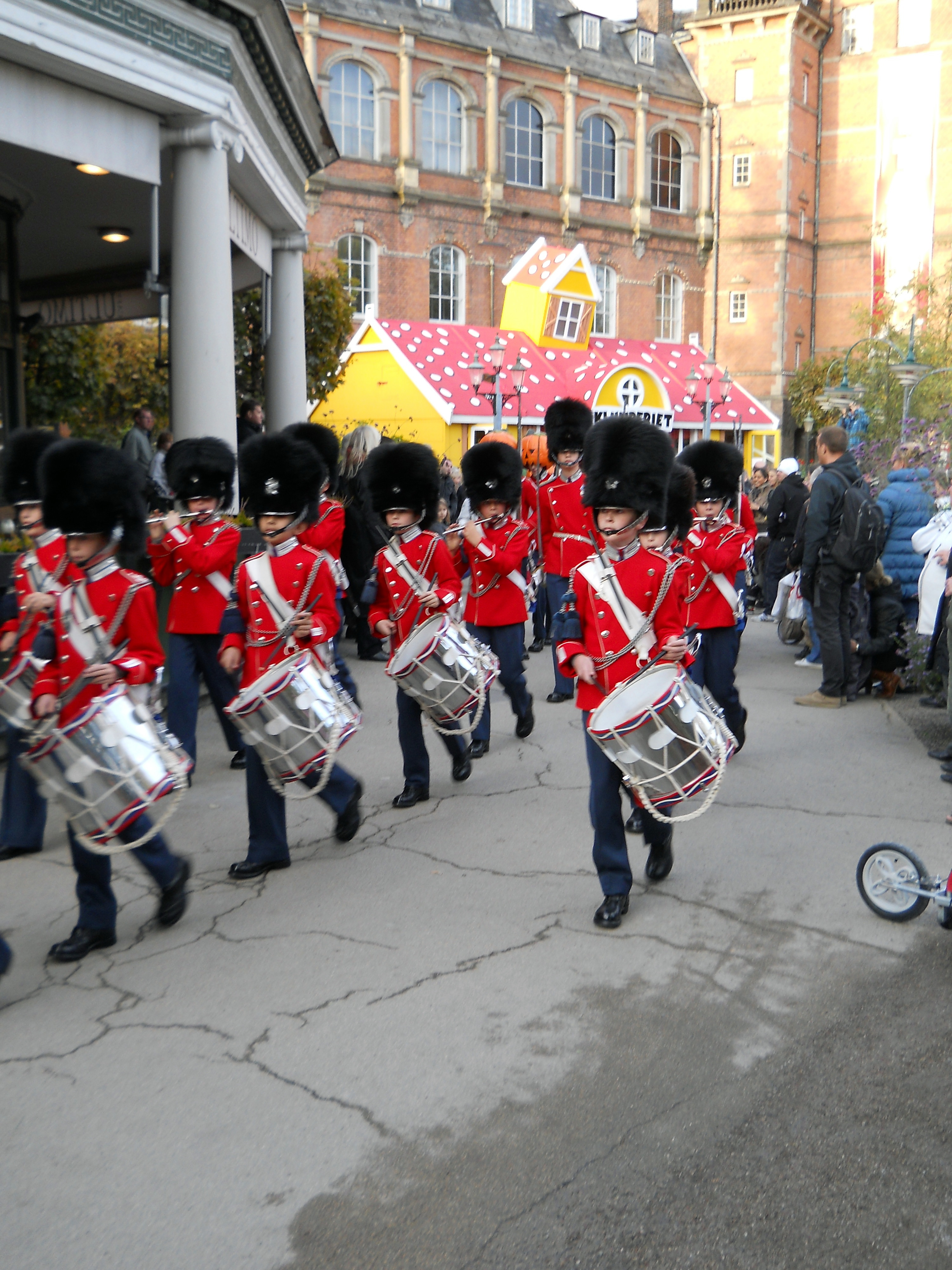
Tivoligarden Youth Guard parade

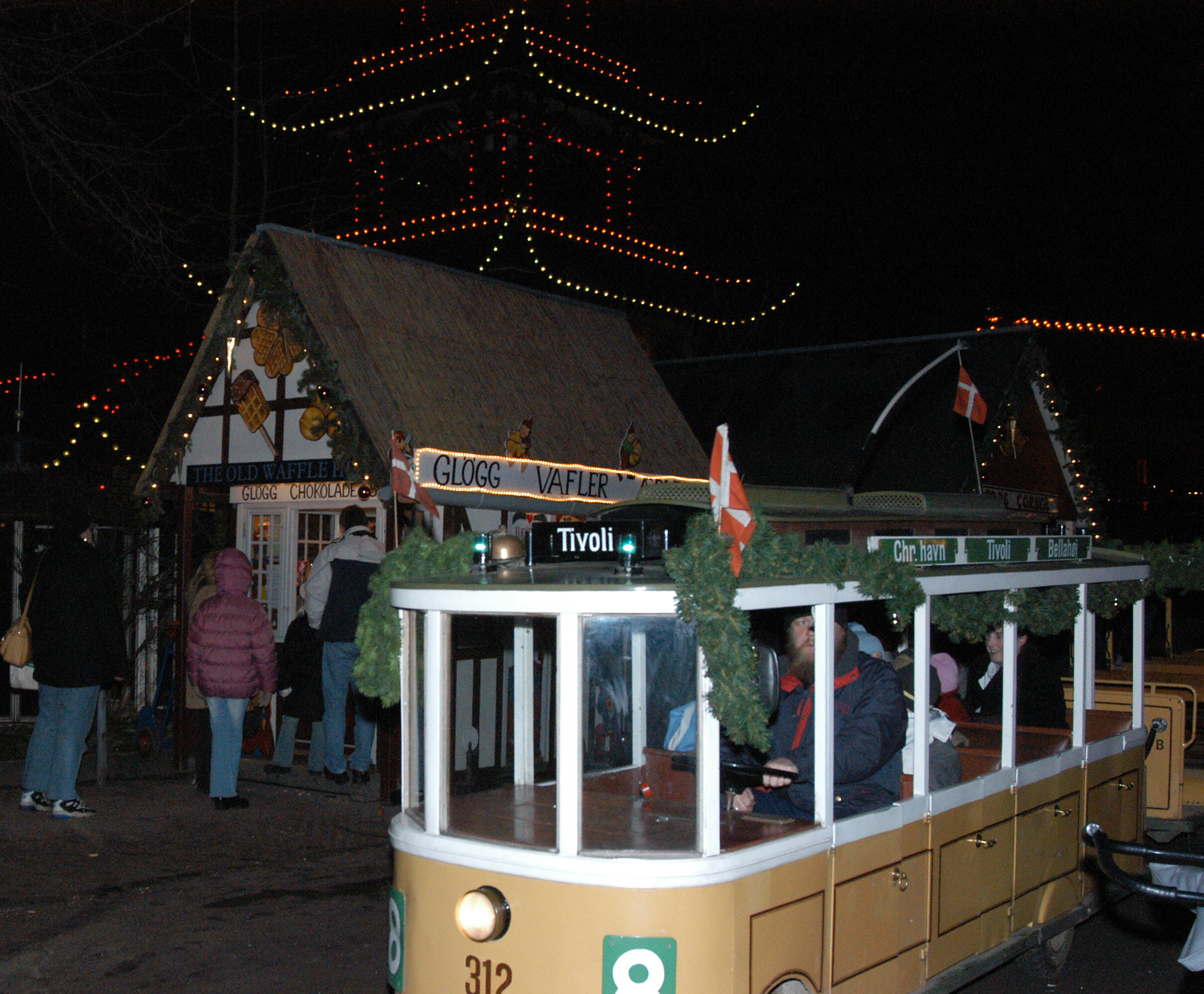
The Vaffelbageriet in Tivoli at night

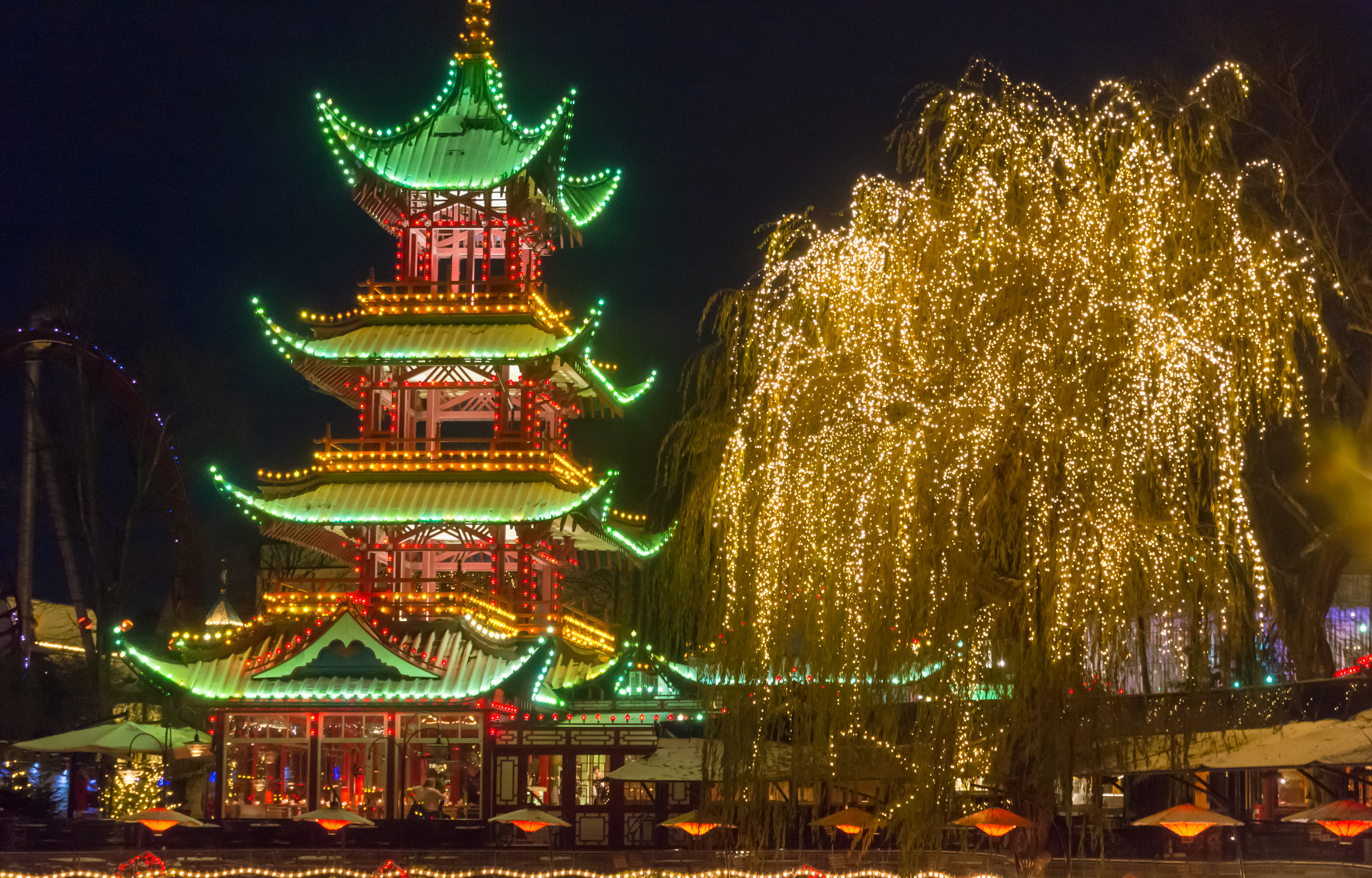
The Chinese Tower at night

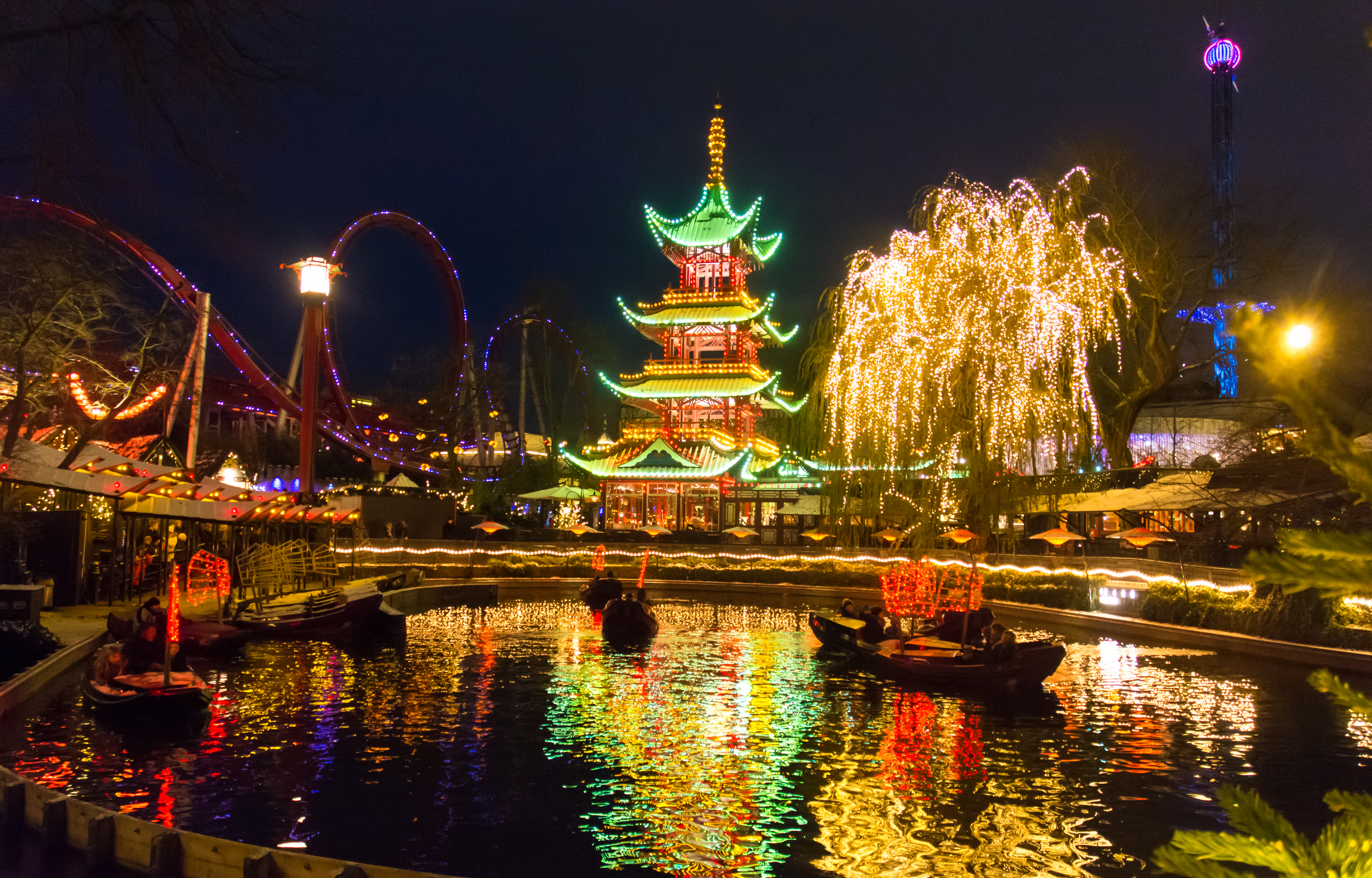
Tivoli Gardens Chinese tower and boating lake

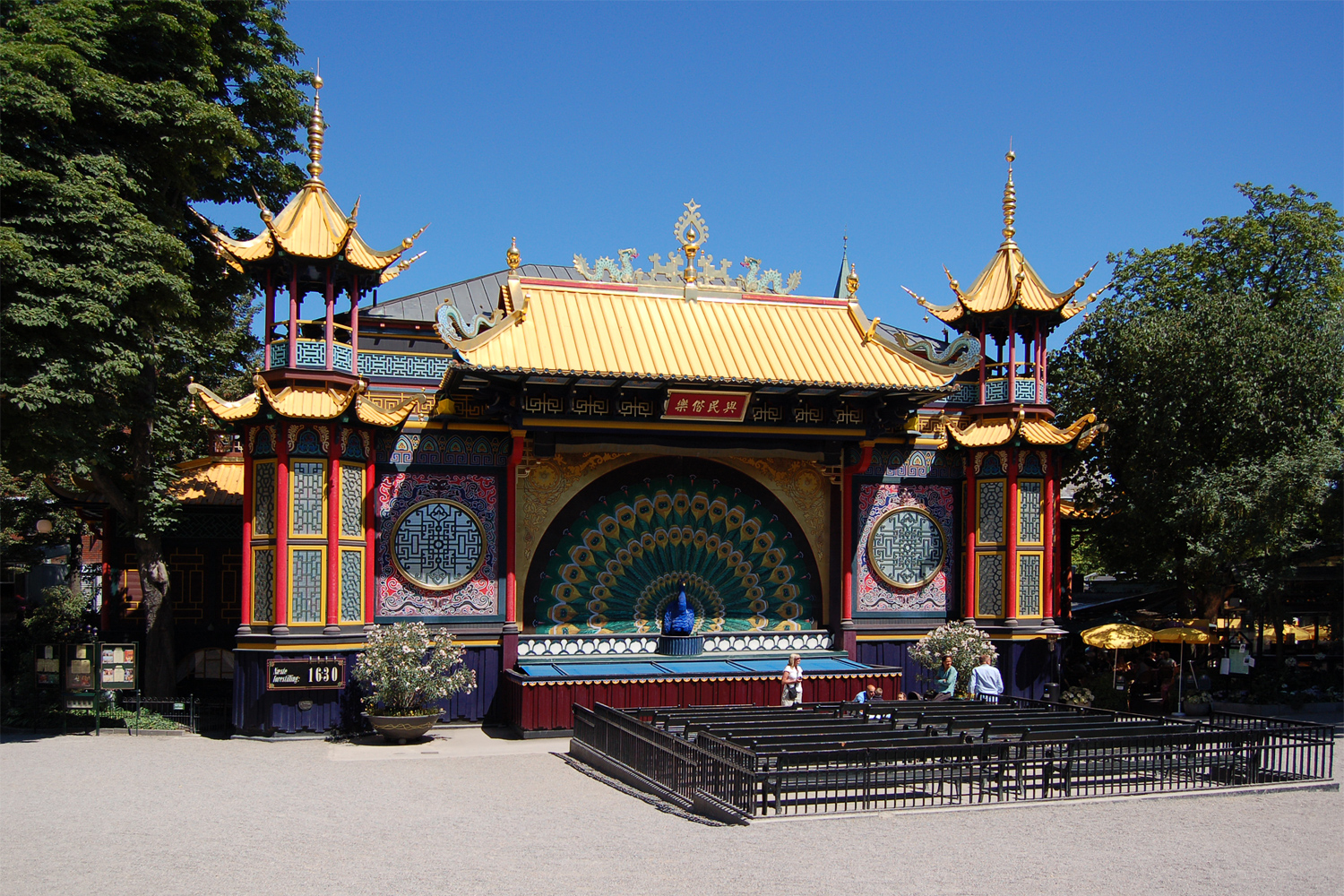
The Pantomime Theatre

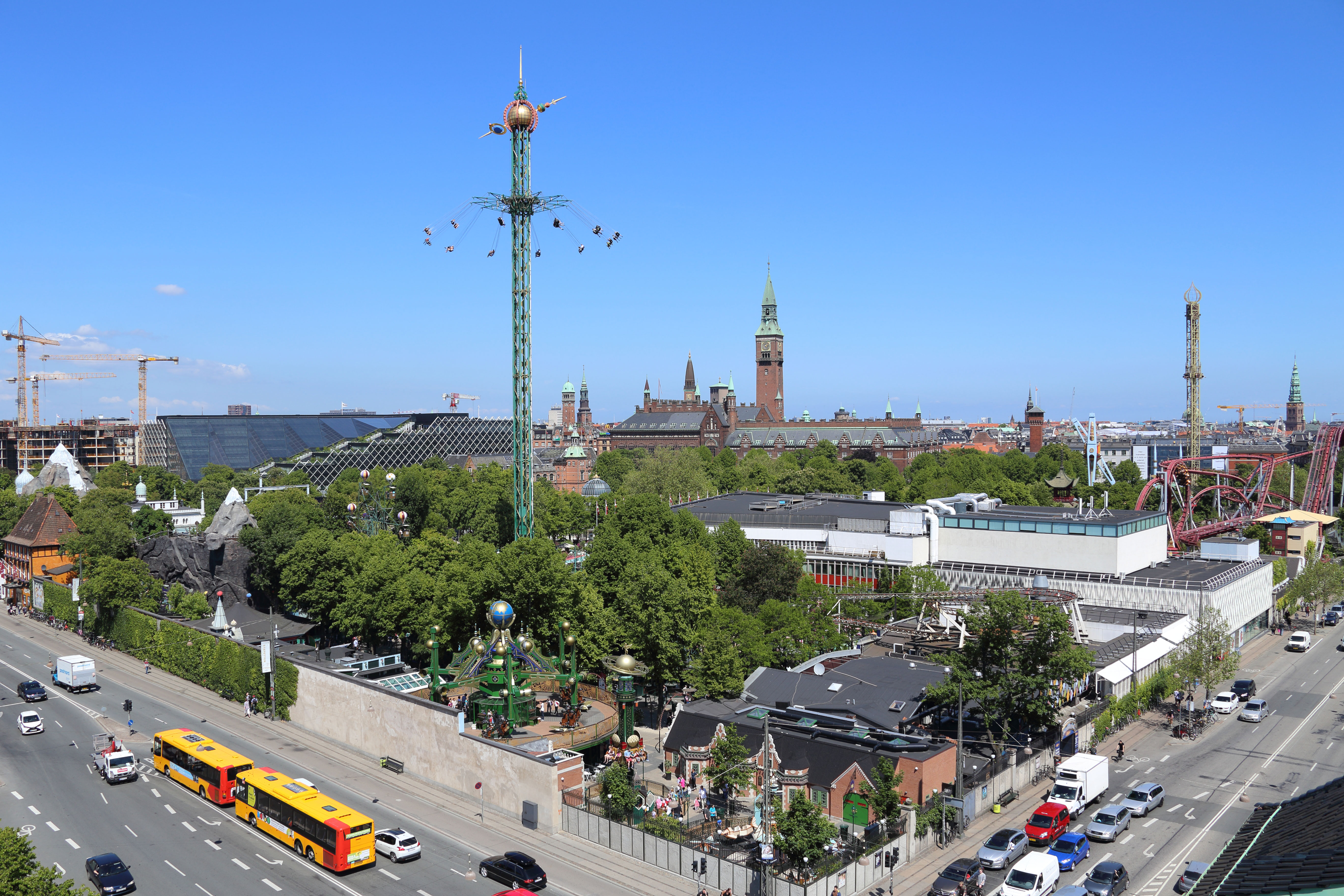
Tivoli Gardens seen from a birds eye view in 2015

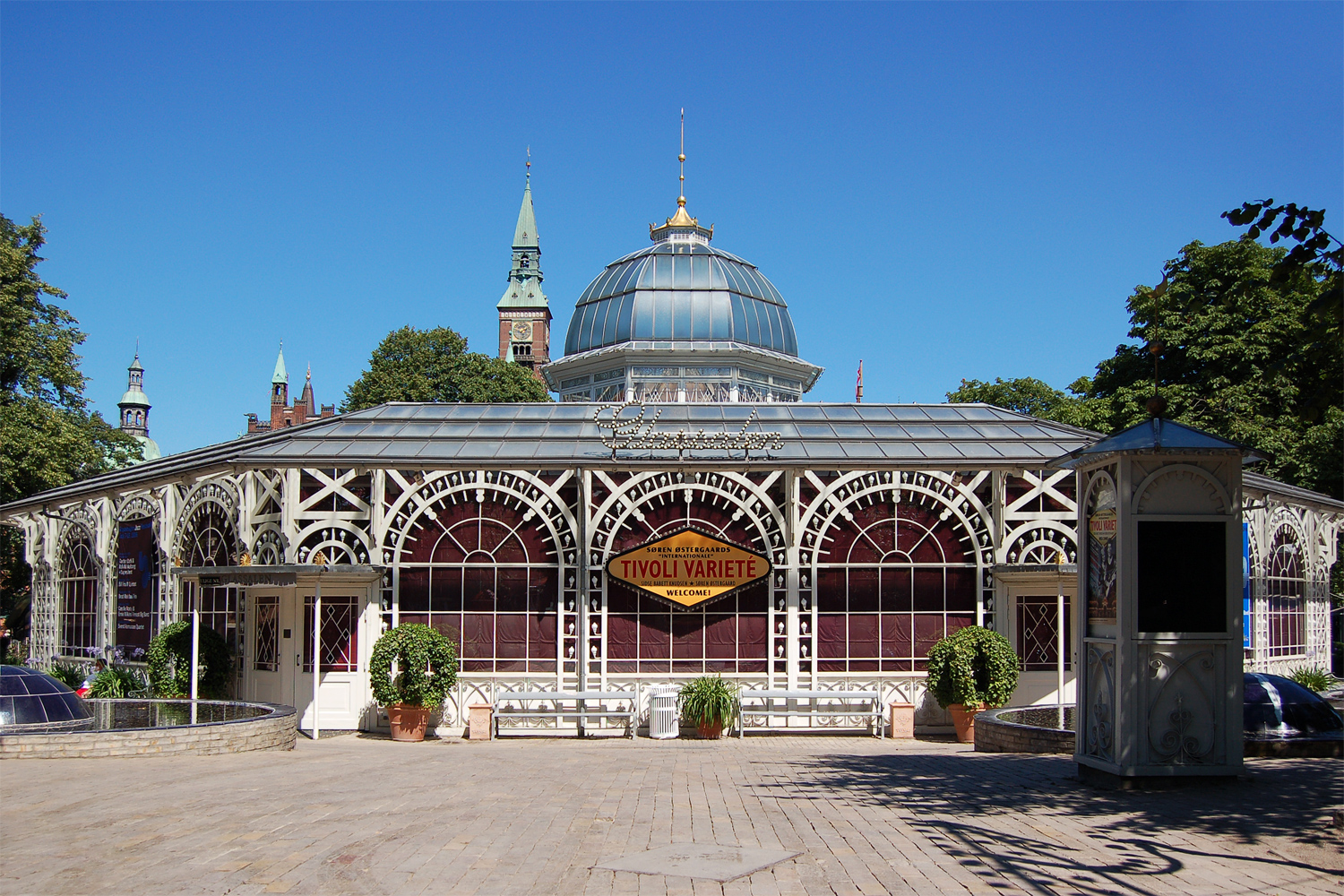
The Glass Hall

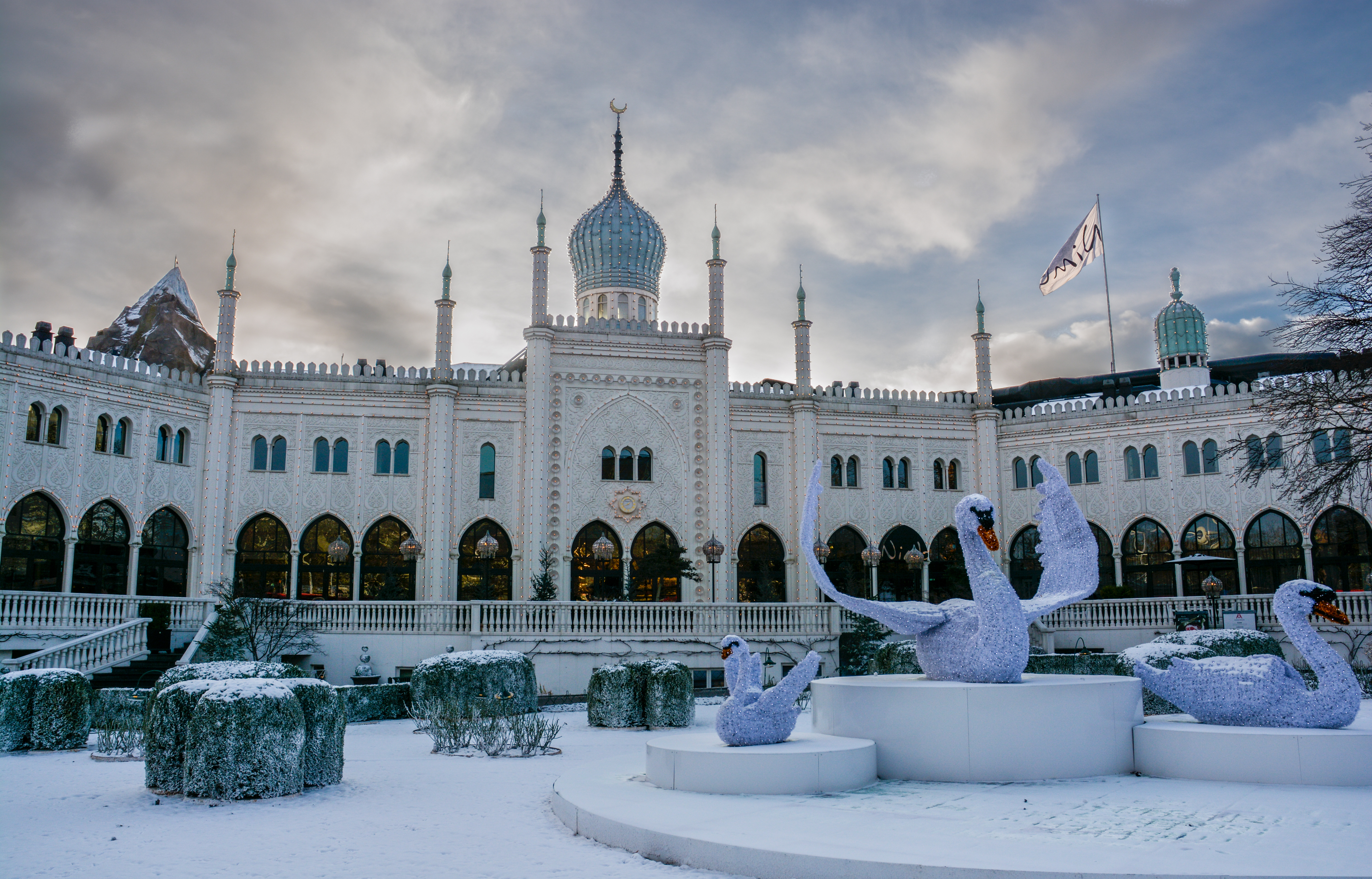
Tivoli's Moorish Palace, the Nimb Hotel and Restaurant

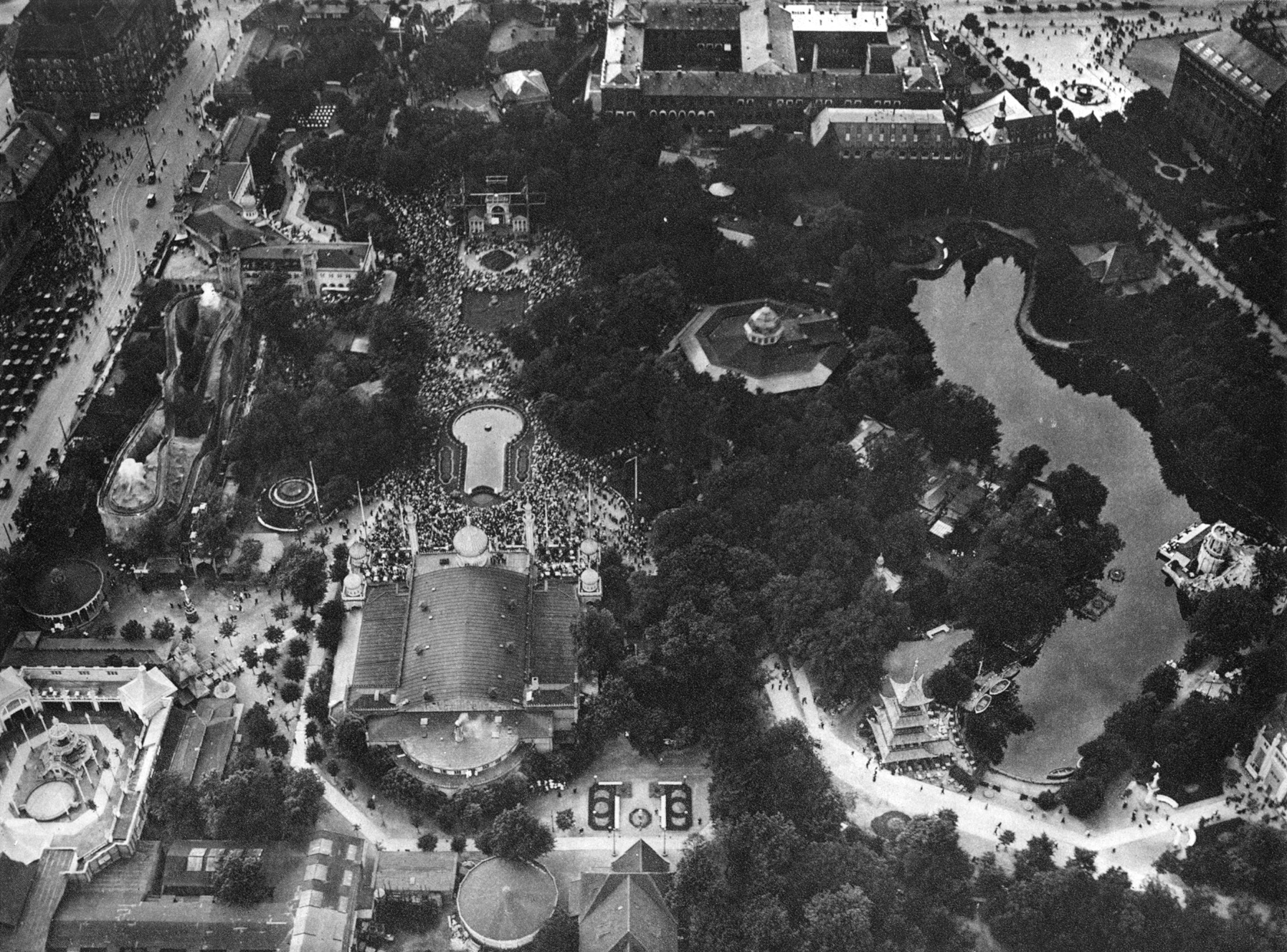
Aerial photography, taken from Eduard Spelterini's balloon on 22 June 1922

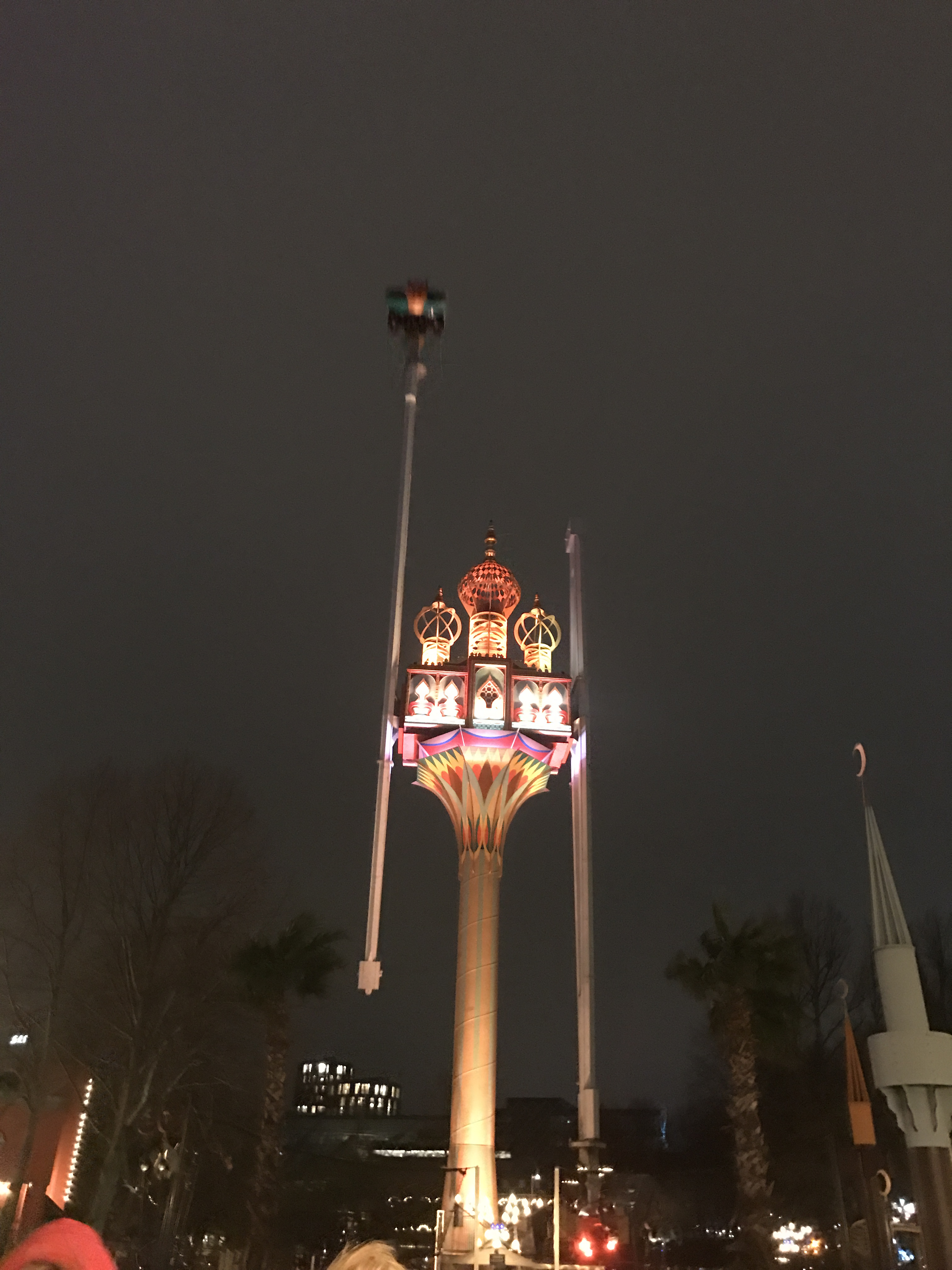
Vertigo in Tivoli

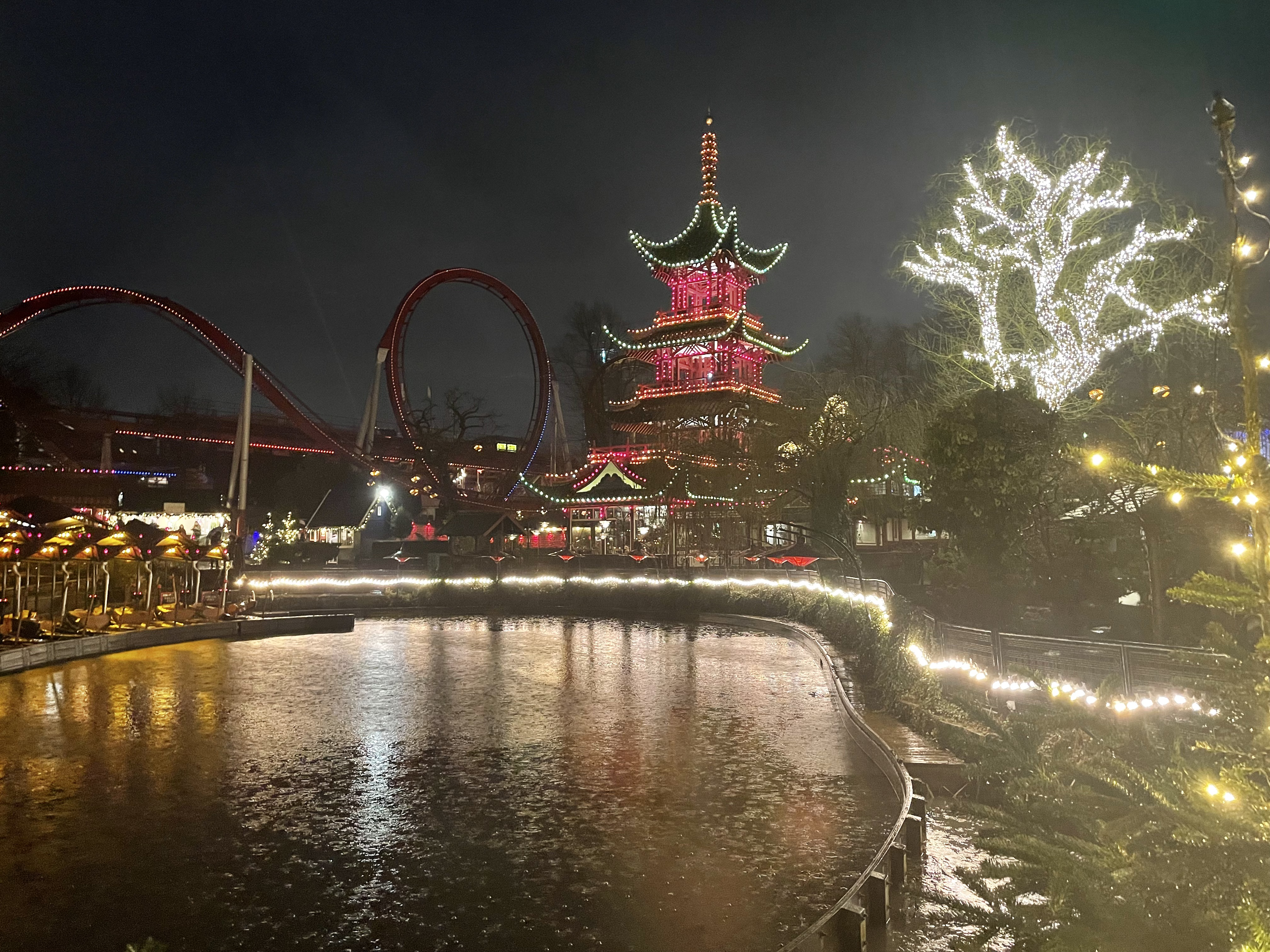
Tivoli Gardens, New Year's Eve 2023–2024

== See also ==
- Nimb Hotel
- Tourism in Denmark
