= Thomas Winkler (artist) =

Danish multi-discipline artist (born 1963)

- Born: 25 October 1963 (age 63); Frederiksberg, Denmark
- Education: Institut Bjarnov; School of Arts and Crafts; School of Decorative Art (Skolen for Brugskunst)
- Occupations: Fashion and costume designer, playwright, sculptor, painter, illustrator, designer
- Years active: 1986 – present

Thomas Winkler (born 25 October 1963) is a Danish multi-displicine artist.

With a background in clothing design, he has designed theatre costumes and robes for actors, drag artists and pop stars. He is also active as a writer, painter, sculptor and designer and as the ‘house artist‘ and designer for Copenhagen's Tivoli Gardens. He is celebrated for his extravagant use of colours and patterns and his playful and fabulative motifs.

== Early life and education ==
Winkler was born in Frederiksberg, a municipality in the midst of Copenhagen. There, he attended Lindevangen School. He has talked about how as a child he would visit the Tivoli Gardens with his parents; tellingly, what most impressed him were "the flowers, laughing children and reed cheeks".

He graduated as a dance and gymnastics teacher at the private Institut Bjarnov in Frederiksberg in 1982, but went on to take courses in subjects like composition and illustration at Kolding's School of Arts and Crafts (Kolding Kunsthåndværkerskole) and at Copenhagen's School of Decorative Art (Skolen for Brugskunst), from which he graduated as a clothing designer in 1986.

== Career ==
=== As a fashion and costume designer ===
From the outset, Winkler's designs stood out as sumptuous, colourful and elegantly fabulative, causing Berlingske Tidende to hail him as "an excellent Danish representative of the latest trend in fashion, which is a reaction against the minimalist style and ascetic lifestyle of recent years". His creations often make use of untraditional materials, as when he created a series of hats made out of Hessian wallpaper, a waistcoat out of plastic postcards and wool or a whole collection of outfits made out of bast and straw from old baskets, curtains, coconut mats and shopping nets.

Winkler has spoken about fashion as a form of artistic expression, yet in spite of his extravagant style, he once noted that "I'd prefer to see one of my dresses on a bus 14 to Vanløse than a 100 times in the Royal theatre". On the same occasion he suggested that

"Clothes should not be made according to a pattern, but according to a recipe, such as: 7 parts aesthetics, 1 part eroticism, 1 part mystery, 1 part comedy. May be decorated with bit of greenery."

While clearly drawing inspiration from many epochs, styles and artists, Winkler has spoken of Bjørn Wiinblad, who also made creations for the Tivoli Gardens, as a role model.

His first appointment was as a designer for the InWear brand (under DK Company) in 1989. As an independent designer, he has created outfits and gowns for local drag artists and celebrities, including Hanne Boel and her band and the pop band Aqua.

Since 1990, he has been creating costumes and set designs for Riddersalen, a vaudeville, cabaret, children's and youth theatre in Frederiksberg.

In 1999, he created the costumes for Copenhagen's Folketeatret's Fortællingen om enhver, and in 2002, he created the costumes for Carl Nielsen's Masquerade at Den Jyske Opera in Aarhus.

=== As a multi-discipline artist and designer ===
Winkler has worked in a number of media, creating illustrations for books and record covers, interior café decorations (e.g., Café Luna and Café Roberta, both in Copenhagen), ice-cream cups, etc.

From 1994 to 1995, he was affiliated with LEGO Futura, a special product-development department of the Lego Group, as a designer and product developer.

He continues to create posters for Riddersalen.

=== As a writer for theatre and film ===
Winkler wrote a number of plays for Riddersalen, such as:

- 1996: Jorden rundt på gulvet : en musikalsk farce. Co-written with Signe Birkbøll, Katrine Jensenius, Peter Bichsel
- 1998: Spøgelseslege
- 2004: Langt ude i skoven
- 2008: Tulipanmysteriet. Co-written with Signe Birkbøll

Winkler has also created commercials and music videos.

=== House artist for the Tivoli Gardens ===
In 2009, Winkler was hired by the Tivoli Gardens to create the interior designs for the Tivoli Hotel and Congress Centre. He was soon offered a permanent position as a ‘house artist’ overseeing every aspect of design, colour schemes and decorations in the gardens.

When asked, he has mentioned that one of his proudest moments was when he redesigned the gardens' bin trucks in such a style that visitors began to photograph them, which made the drivers feel more seen and included.

Winkler also designs much of the gardens' merchandise, such as Christmas baubles, music boxes, coffee tins, cups and napkins.

He has designed several of the official posters, including one celebrating the gardens' 180th anniversary.

=== Prizes and awards ===
In 2017, Winkler received the Pråsprisen for an illustration of actor Jytte Abildstrøm and her son Peter Mygind, also an actor.

=== Other contributions ===
Winkler contributes lead vocals on the song "Swing Low" off the CD of the same title by jazz singer Birgitte Soojin. He also appears on the song "Love" off the 2010 album 7 Shortcuts to Change: Music with Subconscious Learning by jazz singer Thulla.
