= Sarah Hengler =

British businesswoman, pyrotechnist, firework artist (c.1765–1845)

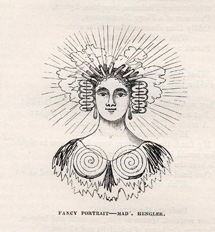
- Fancy Portrait - Madame Hengler in The Comic Annual Second Edition by Thomas Hood
- Born: c. 1765; Surrey, England
- Died: 9 October 1845
- Spouse: John Michael Hengler
- Children: 3

Sarah Hengler (c.1765 – 9 October 1845) was a British businesswoman, pyrotechnist and firework artist. She was one of the "Fire Queens" of Vauxhall Gardens.

== Early and personal life ==
Sarah Hengler was born in Surrey, England c. 1765. She was the second wife of the circus performer John Michael Hengler and they had three children, Henry Michael (1784-1861), Tobias Joseph (born and died 1786), and Magdalen Elizabeth (b.c.1788). Henry Michael Hengler became a circus rope walker and his children and grandchildren, including Frederick Charles Hengler and Jenny Hengler, became leading players in the British circus field.

== Career ==
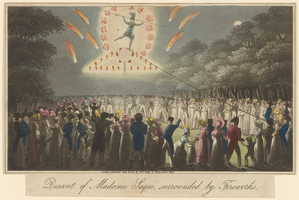
Madame Saqui in a short tunic and trousers, running down a tightrope surrounded by fireworks, over a large crowd gathered watching her outside surrounded by trees in Vauxhall Gardens

Sarah Hengler initially worked as a tightrope walker but after her marriage she created and presented firework displays for Vauxhall Gardens, Astley's Royal Amphitheatre, the Royal Circus and the Surrey Theatre. She collaborated with Madame Saqui, a leading tightrope walker of the day, providing the fireworks which were a part of Saqui's act. Hengler toured with her family, supplying fireworks to accompany their acrobatic rope performances. The Hengler family performed at a "Grand Display of Fire Works and Instrumental Concert" during the Leicester Races in September 1821.

John Michael Hengler died in 1802 and Sarah Hengler took over running the business for the next thirty nine years. She remarried on 6 December 1808 and became Mrs Fields, although she was also known as Mrs Wells, but continued to use the Madame Hengler name. She was sometimes known as Signora Hengler as well. She continued to create firework displays, running the business from a property, number 4 Asylum Buildings, off Westminster Bridge Road on the south side of Westminster Bridge in London. The property had a ground floor showroom, workshops for packing fireworks and accommodation for Hengler plus her staff and family members. Three people were killed in a series of explosions there in August 1818.

In 1821 Thomas Bish bought the lease to Vauxhall Gardens and started work revitalising the public entertainments. He sent Hengler to Paris to learn cutting edge techniques from the pyrotechnists at the Jardin de Tivoli, famed for its firework displays.

On 9 July 1822, Madame Hengler, described as The King's Pyrotechnic, was involved in experiments run by Henry Trengrouse in Hyde Park across the Serpentine. Trengrouse was attempting to create a rocket on a rope that could be fired to ships in distress near shore and enable a rescue chair to be set up. Hengler was credited with inventing the rocket element of the lifesaving equipment.

In August 1882, Hengler advertised “the newly-invented Green Fire" as part of a new fireworks display, shortly after the recipe for a chlorate-based green fire had been published in The Quarterly Journal of Science, Literature and the Arts. Advertising claimed that the green fire was “unknown to any other Artist”.

In 1830, Hood's Comic Annual published an Ode to Madame Hengler, the Firework maker to Vauxhall and in 1839 the poet Thomas Hood also wrote an Ode to Madame Hengler.

== Later life and commemoration ==
In 1841 her daughter Magdalene, took over running the business and Hengler retired. Sarah Hengler was killed in a fire at the Asylum Buildings premises during October 1845. Her son Michael performed as a tightrope dancer on the same bill as Madame Saqui in the Hippdrome in Paris in 1852, to "immense success".

The family circus business is commemorated by a pub called The Hengler’s Circus in Glasgow, where their circus ran on Sauchiehall Street between 1904 and 1924.
