= Frederick Charles Hengler =

English circus proprietor

Frederick Charles Hengler (c. 1820 – 28 September 1887) was an English circus proprietor. From 1857 he established permanent circuses in several cities.

== Life ==
=== Background ===
Frederick Charles Hengler was born c. 1820 into a circus family. Hengler's paternal grandfather, Michael Hengler (died 1802), was a rider and performer in Hanover, and moved to England. His grandmother was Sarah Hengler, known professionally as Madame Hengler, a leading fireworks pyrotechnist at Vauxhall and Ranelagh Pleasure Gardens, Astley’s Circus and many high profile outdoor public entertainments. Their son Henry Michael Hengler (1784–1861) was a circus performer who married Jane Pilsworth on 9 January 1808 in Dublin. The couple had eleven children, including Edward Henry, John Milton, and Frederick Charles. Henry was well-known as a tight-rope dancer at Vauxhall Gardens; in 1807 he was at the Olympic Theatre, and afterwards was engaged for several years by Andrew Ducrow. After leaving Ducrow, he joined Price and Powell's circus. Henry taught the circus business to his three sons.

=== Early career ===
In 1841 Frederick Charles was a violin and trumpet player in the band of Mrs. James Wild's theatre at Bradford. He was later the business manager of Price and Powell's travelling circus; but when they got into difficulties they sold their circus to him and his brother Edward, who for some years carried on the business with varied success. In 1847 Frederick Charles founded his own circus, performing in a tent during the summer and in temporary structures in towns during the winter.

=== Permanent circuses ===
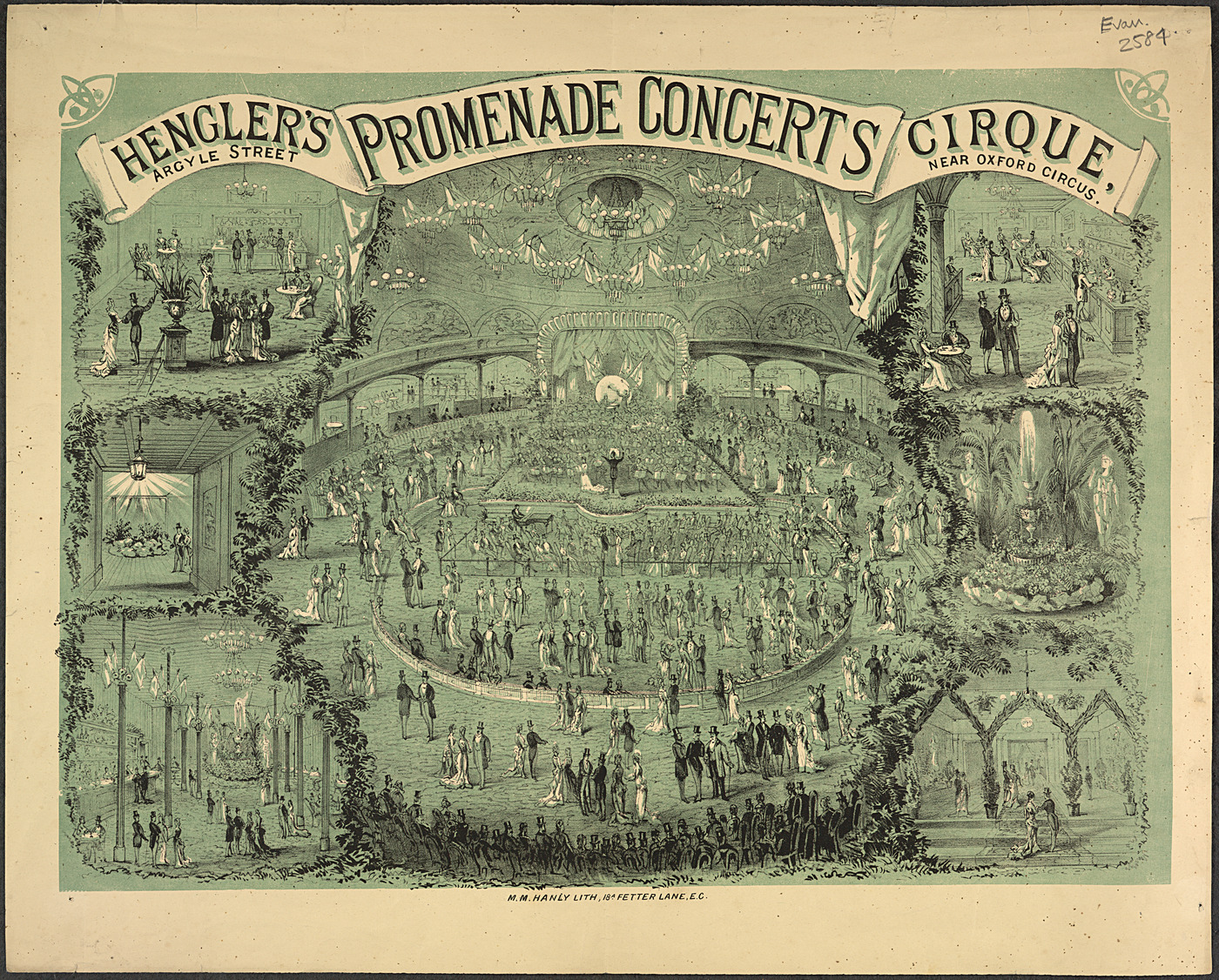
A poster for Hengler's promenade concerts at Hengler's Cirque, Argyll Street, London

Hengler established in March 1857 a permanent circus in Liverpool, and erected buildings in Glasgow and Dublin in 1863, in Hull in 1866, in Bristol in 1867, and in Birmingham in 1868. He maintained companies that moved from one circus to another. During the summer of 1865 he gave a series of performances at the Stereorama in Cremorne Gardens, Chelsea.

He purchased in 1871 the Palais Royal, Argyll Street, London, and converted it into a circus. Here, in addition to the usual equestrian scenes of the ring, he introduced spectacular pieces played by children. "Cinderella", brought out at Christmas 1871, was very popular. His Liverpool circus was rebuilt in 1876 in the style of the Cirque d'hiver in Paris. The Glasgow circus, originally in West Nile Street, moved to new premises in Wellington Street in 1885, and to Sauchiehall Street in 1904, closing in 1924. The London circus was rebuilt in 1884; it remained until 1910, when it was rebuilt as the Palladium Theatre, retaining part of the façade.

Hengler established a reputation for providing good entertainment. He himself never attempted any character parts, but was a great horse-tamer, and frequently exhibited his trained animals. He died suddenly at his home, Cambridge House, Fitzjohn's Avenue, Hampstead, on 28 September 1887, and was buried at West Hampstead Cemetery. He left a personalty of £60,000.

== Family ==
He married in 1846 Mary Ann Frances Sprake. After Hengler's death the circuses were managed by their two younger sons, Frederich Charles and Albert Henry. They installed "sinking rings", which were filled with water for aquatic displays. A daughter, Jenny Louise, obtained a wide reputation as an accomplished equestrian performer.
