= Jenny Hengler =

British equestrian performer

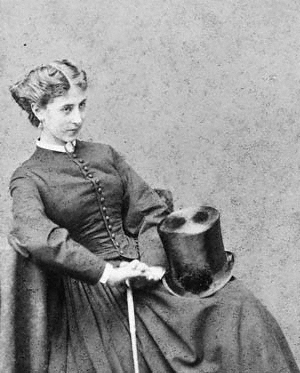
- Born: Jenny Louise Hengler; 23 March 1849; Lewes
- Died: 16 April 1935 (aged 86); Paddington, London
- Other names: Jenny Kamienski
- Occupation: circus performer
- Known for: horse riding
- Spouse: Count Waldemar Alexander Oscar Kamienski
- Children: 3

Jenny Louise Hengler (later Jenny Kamienski, born 23 March 1849 – 16 April 1935) was a British equestrian performer at her family's Hengler's Circus. She rose to be the star performer before she moved to America in the 1880s.

== Life ==
Hengler was born in Lewes.

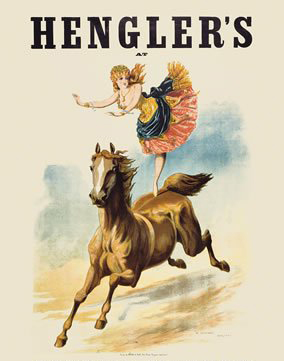
Jenny Hengler

Her parents were Mary Ann Frances (born Sprake) and Frederick Charles Hengler. Her paternal great-grandfather was circus performer Michael Hengler (died 1802), was a rider and performer in Hanover, who moved to England. Other relatives also performed in circuses. Her great grandmother was Sarah Hengler, known professionally as Madame Hengler, a leading fireworks pyrotechnist at Vauxhall and Ranelagh Pleasure Gardens, Astley’s Circus and many high profile outdoor public entertainments. Her father was not a performer per se but he started the Hengler's Circus in 1847. The circus moved to the first of several permanent buildings in 1857. The first was in Liverpool and others followed over the next 15 years.

She was soon a performer and by 1857 she is recorded as appearing in a Bradford pantomime. She was renowned for the quality of her riding which was regarded as a touchstone when judging how others rode. Her beauty was also widely acknowledged. In 1871 she was on the cover of the Illustrated Newspaper.

She became the star of the London location in 1873. The following year she married Waldemar Alexander Oscar Kamienski on 6 May 1874. Her husband had been a rider with the circus since 1869 and was said to be a Polish Count. He rode and performed at Hengler's Circus under the name "Alexander Oscar". She never appeared again at her family's circus venues but in 1882 she performed at Hengler's International Circus in Newcastle upon Tyne.

Sometime in the 1880s they went to America where they had a house at Astoria, Long Island. Her husband organised horse riding at Beretta College. She was reported to have returned to England in 1892 to attend her sister's wedding. She and her husband had three children, Walter, Albert, and Beatrice.

By the time of the 1901 United Kingdom census, she was a widow. She died in Paddington on 16 April 1935, at the age of 86.

== Legacy ==
A pub in Glasgow in Sauchiehall Street is named "The Hengler's Circus" after the family's circus. Jenny Hengler features in a number of the information boards inside.
