= Dæmonen =

Roller coaster in Copenhagen, Denmark

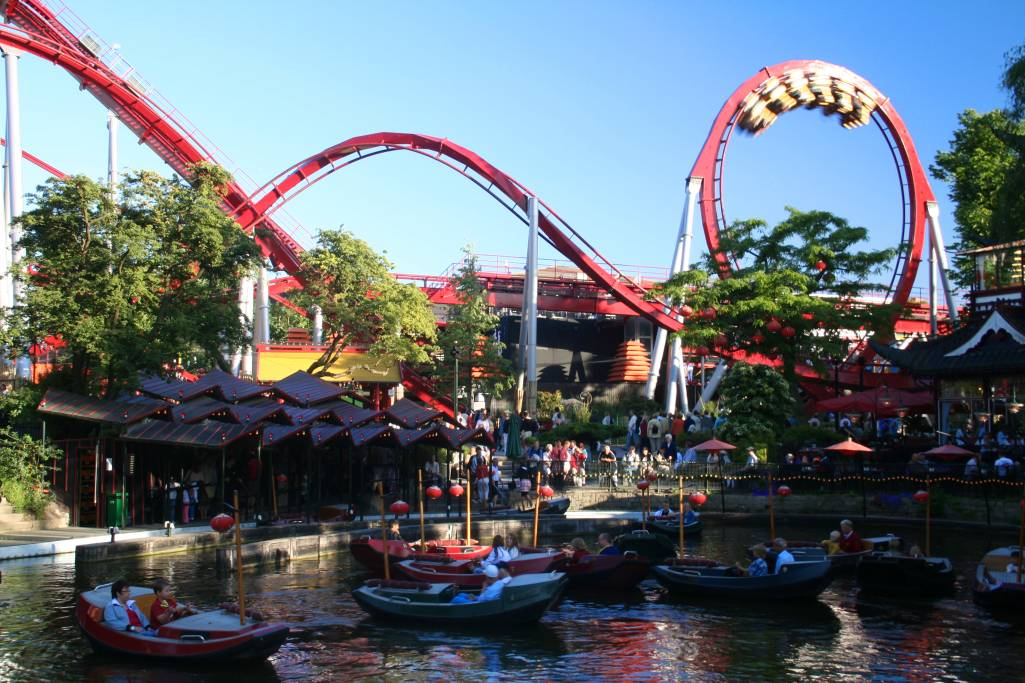
- Part of Dæmonen's track

Tivoli Gardens
- Location: Tivoli Gardens
- Coordinates: 55°40′22″N 12°34′13″E
- Status: Operating
- Opening date: 16 April 2004
- Cost: 75 million DKK (€10 M)
- Replaced: Slangen

General statistics
- Type: Steel – Floorless Coaster
- Manufacturer: Bolliger & Mabillard
- Model: Floorless Coaster
- Track layout: Twister
- Lift/launch system: Chain lift hill
- Height: 28 m (92 ft)
- Drop: 20 m (66 ft)
- Length: 564 m (1,850 ft)
- Speed: 77 km/h (48 mph)
- Inversions: 3
- Duration: 1:46
- Capacity: 1,200 riders per hour
- G-force: 4
- Height restriction: 132 cm (4 ft 4 in)
- Trains: 2 trains with 6 cars. Riders are arranged 4 across in a single row for a total of 24 riders per train.
- Dæmonen at RCDB

Dæmonen is a floorless steel roller coaster at the Tivoli Gardens amusement park in Copenhagen, Denmark. Designed by Bolliger & Mabillard, it reaches a height of 28 metres (92 ft), is 564.0 metres (1,850.4 ft) long, and reaches a maximum speed of 77 kilometres per hour (48 mph). The roller coaster features a vertical loop, an Immelmann loop, and a zero-gravity roll. Dæmonen replaced Slangen, a family roller coaster, and officially opened on 16 April 2004. A record number of guests attended the park that year, but the public has since given the ride mixed reviews.

== History ==
The plans to build the roller coaster, then nameless, was announced in August 2003, to replace Slangen. The idea had been three years in the making and Tivoli had held a procurement involving four roller coaster manufactures, with Bolliger & Mabillard being chosen to build the new roller coaster. With a total cost of 75 million DKK (€10 million), the attraction was at the time Tivoli's biggest investment in modern times, and the most expensive roller coaster in Denmark. It was named Dæmonen in January 2004.

Slangen, Tivoli Gardens's family roller coaster, closed on 21 September 2003 to make room for Dæmonen. Once the roller coaster was demolished, construction for the new roller coaster commenced. By the beginning of December, most of the brake run and station portions of the track were erected. By the new year, the lift hill was topped off. The first drop was completed by the end of January 2004 and the last piece of track was placed in February. It opened on 16 April that year, and was sponsored by Mazda for its first three years in operation.

On 14 July 2007, Dæmonen got stuck during a ride, and the passengers would have to wait an hour before they could be released by the fire department. On 20 July 2008, the ride stopped 25 meters above the ground, and 24 passengers were evacuated via built-in stairs. The latter incident was caused by a loose connection in an electronic sensor, which triggered the emergency brakes.

On 6 April 2017 an optional, up-charge virtual reality experience was added to the ride. Utilising Samsung VR headsets, the graphics depict scenes of dragons, demons, and other elements from Chinese mythology.

== Ride experience ==
After riders have boarded and the station floor is retracted, the train begins to climb the 28-metre-tall (92 ft) chain lift hill. Once at the top, the train makes an approximate 180-degree downward left turn followed by an upward right turn. Following the turn, the train enters the main 20-metre (65.6 ft) drop reaching a top speed of 77 kilometres per hour (48 mph) leading directly into a vertical loop. The train then immediately goes through an Immelmann loop. Next, the train makes a slightly banked right turn into a zero-gravity roll. After an upward left turn, then another right turn, the train rises up leading into the final brake run. The train then makes a 180-degree left turn leading back to the station. One cycle of the ride lasts about 1 minute and 46 seconds.

== Characteristics ==
=== Track ===
The steel track of Dæmonen is approximately 564 metres (1,850.4 ft) long, and the height of the lift is 28 metres (92 ft) high. The track was designed by Bolliger & Mabillard and is filled with sand to reduce the noise made by the trains. Also, the track is painted red while the supports are silver.

=== Trains ===
Dæmonen operates with two steel and fiberglass trains. Each train has six cars that can seat four rides in a single row, for a total of 24 riders per train; each seat has its own individual over the shoulder restraint. This configuration allows the ride to achieve a theoretical hourly capacity of 1,200 riders per hour. The structure of the trains are colored orange; the seats and restraints are black. Also, unlike traditional steel roller coasters, Dæmonen has no floor on its trains.

== Reception ==
Mia Christensen and Andreas Veilstrup from B.T. said that the ride was fantastic and that it has lived up to its name.

After the first year of the roller coaster's operation, Tivoli Gardens announced that a record 3,346,000 guests attended the park in the 2004 season; however, attendance dropped 186,000 the following year.

Dæmonen has never placed in Amusement Today's Golden Ticket Awards.
