= Paul Ginisty =

French writer and journalist (1855–1932)

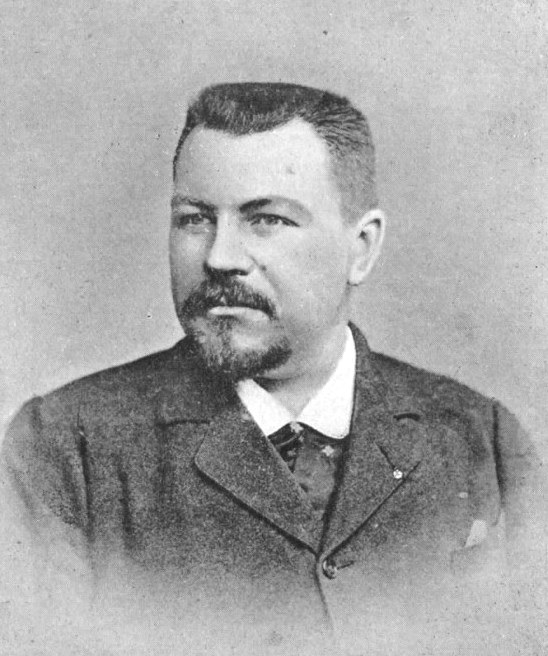
- Paul Ginisty, literary and dramatic critic, director of the Théâtre national de l'Odéon
- Born: 4 April 1855; Paris
- Died: 5 March 1932 (aged 76); Paris
- Occupations: Journalist, writer

Paul Ginisty (4 April 1855 – 5 March 1932) was a French writer, columnist and journalist.

A regular columnist at Gil Blas, he met Guy de Maupassant who would dedicate him his short story Mon oncle Sosthène. From 1896 to 1906, he was theatre manager for the Théâtre de l'Odéon, then became an inspector of monuments historiques.

== Selected bibliography ==
- 1881: Les Idylles parisiennes, (text online at Gallica).
- 1883: Les Rastaquouères : études parisiennes, (text online at Gallica).
- 1884: L'Amour à trois, foreword by Guy de Maupassant.
- 1884: La Seconde Nuit, roman bouffe, (text online at Gallica).
- 1888: Le Dieu bibelot, publisher A-Dupret
- 1901: La Marquise de Sade
- 1903: Vers la bonté, frontispice et fleurons by Henri Caruchet, hors-texte de Paul Steck, Paris, Joanin & Cie
- 1907: Mémoires d'un danseuse de corde : Mme Saqui (1786-1866), (text online at Gallica).
- 1914: Mémoires et souvenirs de comédiennes XVIIIe
- 1922: Anthologie du journalisme du XVIIe siècle à nos jours
- 1923: Les Nids d'aigles
- 1925: Les Anciens Boulevards
- 1929: Eugène Sue
- 1930: Souvenirs de journalisme et de théâtre, (text online at Gallica).
