= Madame Saqui =

French tightrope walker (1786–1866)

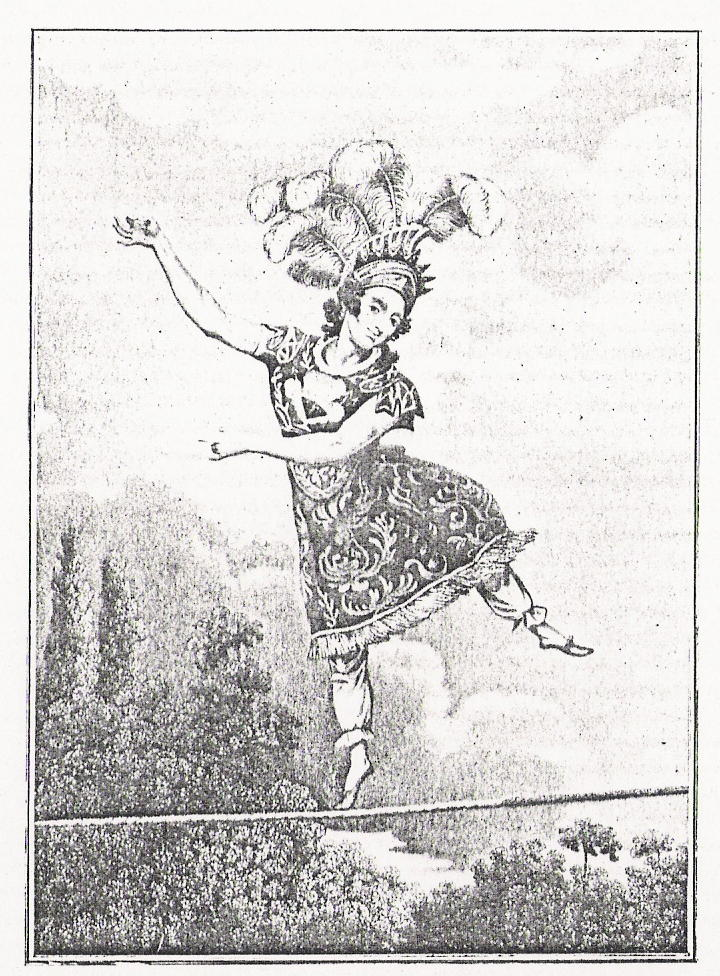
- Madame Saqui performing
- Born: Marguerite-Antoinette Lalanne; 26 February 1786; Agde, Hérault
- Died: 21 February 1866 (aged 79); Neuilly-sur-Seine
- Occupation: tightrope walker

Marguerite-Antoinette Lalanne [maʁɡəʁit ɑ̃twanɛt lalan], known as Madame Saqui (French pronunciation: [ma'dam sa'ki] (26 February 1786 – 21 February 1866) was a French tightrope walker or "rope dancer" who had a long career performing in France and Britain.

== Early life ==
Marguerite-Antoinette Lalanne was born on 26 February 1786 in Agde, Hérault, in southern France. Her parents were Jean-Baptiste Lalanne and Hélène Masgomieri, both circus performers, her father under the name The Great Navarin and her mother La Vierge Noire. She had an older brother Laurent and a younger brother Baptiste. The children took their father's surname although their parents were not married at the time.

The family moved to Paris where her parents performed with the Grands Danseurs du Roi, a troupe of top quality actors, rope dancers, acrobats and artists specialising in farce, who operated under a royal title granted by King Louis XV. In 1789, the troupe took the more cautious name of Théâtre de la Gaîté et des Grands Danseurs following the start of the French Revolution. In 1791, the five year old Marguerite-Antoinette made her stage debut performing with her parents under the name 'la petite Basquaise'. Jean-Baptiste Lalanne's contract was cancelled soon after by Jean-Baptiste Nicolet, the troupe's leader after Lalanne had a bad fall which affected his ability to perform.

Paris was becoming a difficult and unsafe place due to the Revolution, and it was difficult for injured performers to find work. The Lalanne family left Paris in September 1792 for the safer areas of the countryside. They lived in Caen where Jean-Baptiste and Laurent sold potions and pulled teeth and young Marguerite-Antoinette was apprenticed to Mlle Cornu to learn how to make and fit lace bonnets. Charlotte Corday and her grandmother Madame de Bretteville were customers at the shop and there was much shock when news reached them that Corday had assassinated Jean-Paul Marat in July 1793.

== Rediscovering the world of acrobatics ==
Jean-Baptiste Lalanne's business got into trouble in Caen, so he moved the family to Tours. There the family reunited with an old friend from the acrobatics world called Barraut, who was running a troupe called Saleurs Patriotes. Marguerite-Antoinette made friends with one of the performers of her own age, Françoise-Catherine Bénéfand, who performed under the name of Mademoiselle Malaga. She could not forget her early experiences on the stage and secretly took lessons in acrobatics from Barraut. Her first performance, under the name of Mademoiselle Ninette, was undertaken in a pretty costume decorated with lots of patriotic French Republican tricolour ribbons in red, white and blue. Her parents were in the audience but had no idea she was performing and were initially horrified. They were quickly won over after her success and decided to create their own troupe, centred around the Lalanne mother and daughter, joined by other performers.

For four years, the troupe toured around France with varying success but ended up being closed down. The family then joined the Houssay troupe where Marguerite-Antoinette worked under the name of Mademoiselle Forzioso, and honed her skills.

Marguerite-Antoinette Lalanne met acrobatic troup leader Jean-Julien-Pierre Saqui in Épinal, and they married in Tours in 1805, Marguerite-Antoinette becoming Madame Saqui. In 1806, the couple moved to Paris.

== Career as Madame Saqui ==
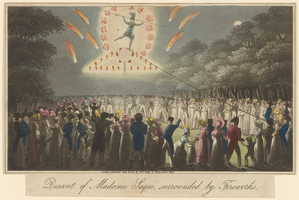
Madame Saqui in a short tunic and trousers, running down a tightrope surrounded by fireworks. She runs over a large crowd gathered below. The fireworks were created for her by Sarah Hengler.

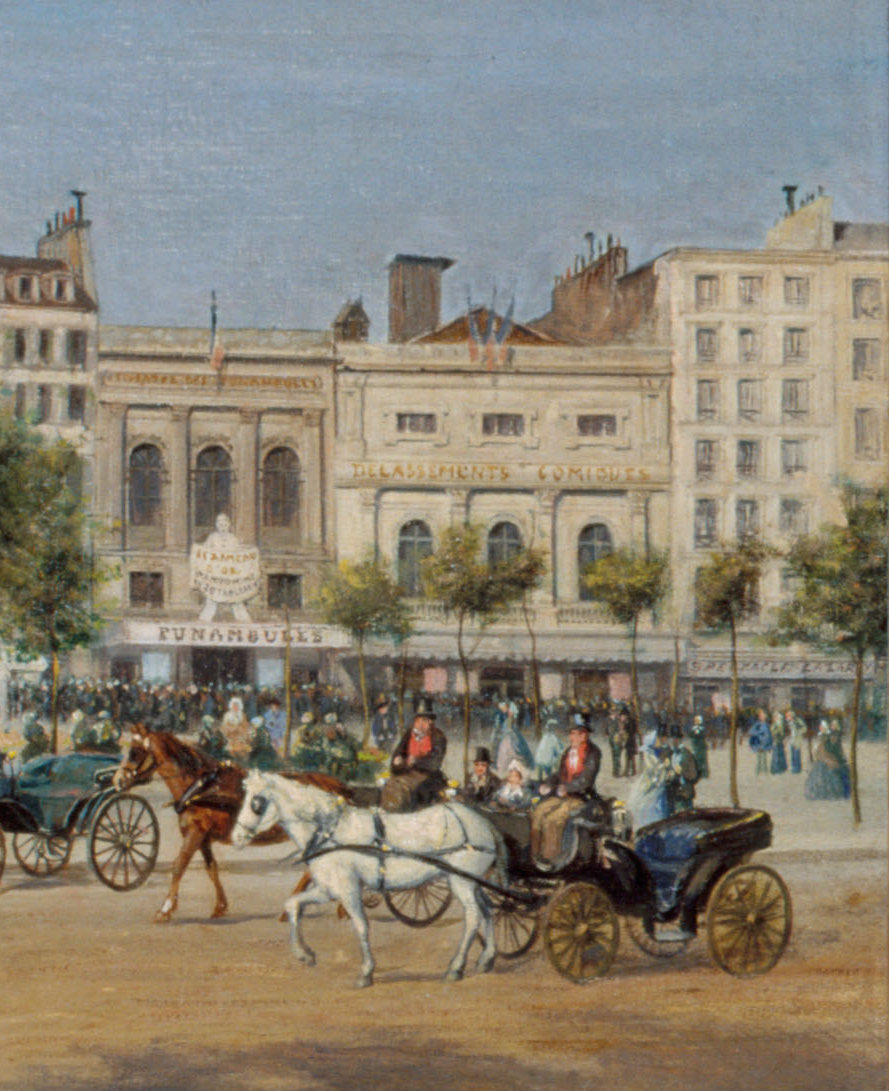
Théâtre des Délassements comiques, former Théâtre de Madame Saqui

Madame Saqui wrote to M. Daneux, director of le Jardin de Tivoli amusement gardens, seeking a place to perform in the capital. He offered her an opportunity and on the Saqui couple's arrival in Paris, they attended a performance by the famous Forioso at the Tivoli. During that performance, Forioso slipped and fell, injuring himself to the extent he was unable to perform. Madame Saqui offered to step in and perform in his stead and Daneux, after some hesitation, accepted. The next day, posters were pasted, announced Madame Saqui's Parisian debut.

Madame Saqui took Paris by storm. One of her spectacular public feats involved tightroping across the River Seine at Pont-Royal, using two flags as balance, dressed in a soldier's uniform. On 15 August, for the public celebrations of the feast day of the Assumption of Mary, a rope was stretched across the Seine, made feasible by the technological advances in manufacturing longer ropes with no splices, developed for Napoleon's navy. Madame Saqui appeared on the rope, wearing a helmet. She feinted a slip for dramatic effect and then threw her helmet away and unravelled her hair, pretending she was going to dive headfirst into the river. The crowd roared their approval and she became a favourite performer of the armed forces.

Her tightrope performance were highly prized by the recently installed Emperor of the French, Napoleon I. They met when Napoleon was hosting a party for some of his soldiers in the Beaujon gardens. He was bored by the entertainment but Madame Saqui caught his eye as she made her entrance on the rope when the wadding from one of the fireworks accompanying her arrival struck her hard on the right arm. She gave a cry of pain and was almost knocked over, but lay down on the rope, holding on to it with her other hand. Napoleon rushed to her aid and touched her injured arm, which caused her to wince but she did not want to miss her opportunity to perform for him and put on a professional smile and climbed back on the rope to resume her interrupted exercises. Napoleon tried to stop her but Saqui replied "Sire, Your Majesty would never have the idea of forbidding his grenadiers to attack... It's my assault, mine!" which impressed him greatly. Napoleon escorted her back to her dressing room, covering her shoulders with a shawl and she became a regular performer for him at military occasions.

Saqui is recorded in having given performances on the tightrope depicting the crossing of Mont Saint-Bernard, the Battle of Wagram and the Fall of Zaragoza during the Peninsular War (both fought in 1809). She perform at the wedding of the Emperor and Marie Louise, Duchess of Parma, and began using the title "first acrobat to His Majesty the Emperor". She had the double-headed imperial eagle painted on her carriage without seeking permission, which upset Napoleon. Saqui was advised via the Minister of Police to leave Paris for the provinces due to this displeasure. She did so but took umbrage and stopped performing her acts that praised his triumphs.

Madame Saqui began to travel to the provinces, where she met with success. She performed in Rouen in 1810 and 1811, in Nîmes in 1812, in Rouen again in 1813, then in Lille, Valenciennes, Ghent and Brussels in 1814. It was in Liège in early 1815 that saw the first instance of her performing as 'the first tightrope artist of His Majesty King Louis XVIII, director of the Government's festivities and ascents', following the restoration of monarchy in France in 1814 under the Bourbon Restoration.

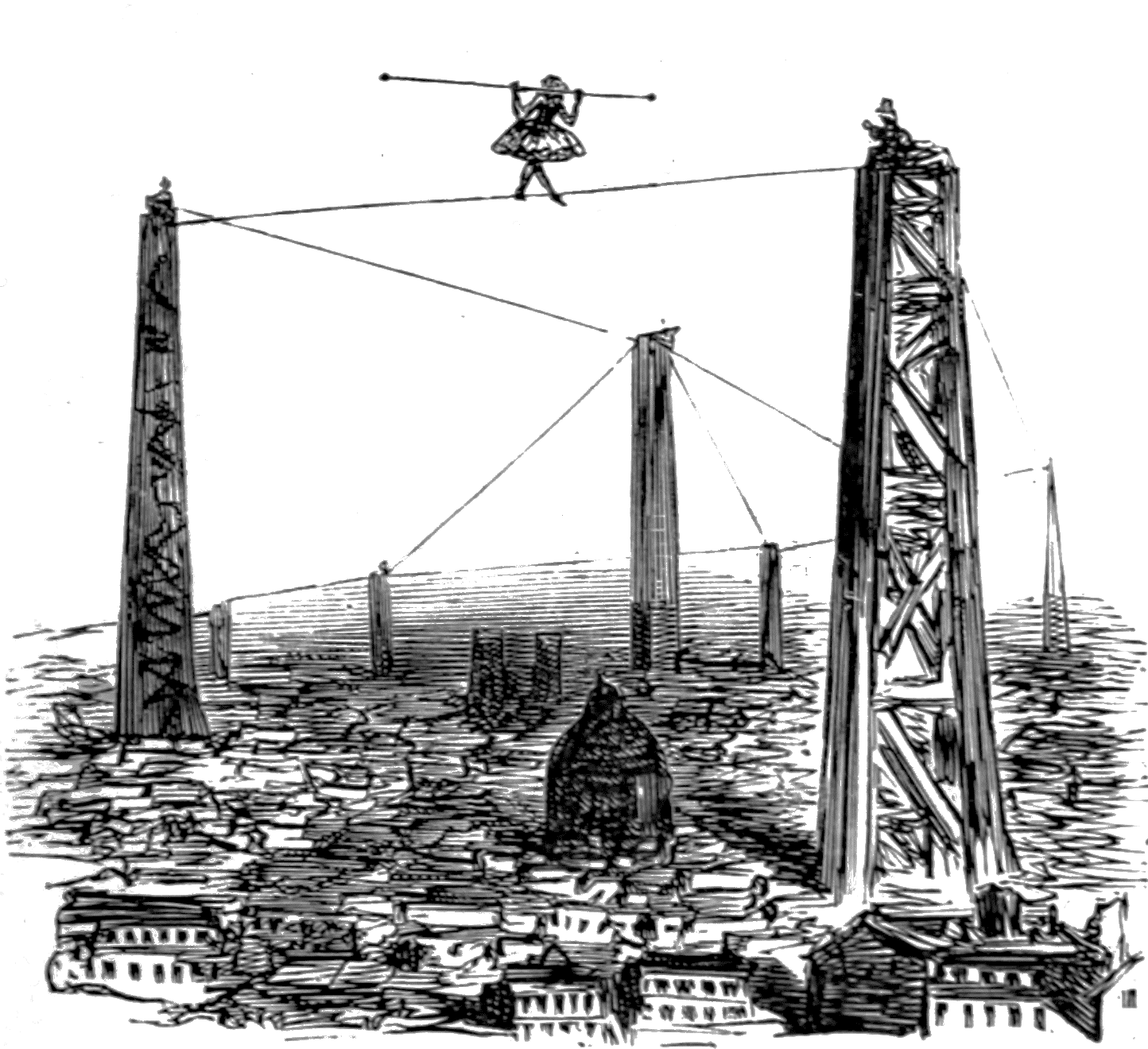
A satirical cartoon by Cham captioned "Madame Saqui was responsible for putting the surveyors in touch with each other during the triangulation operation" of Haussmann's renovation of Paris.

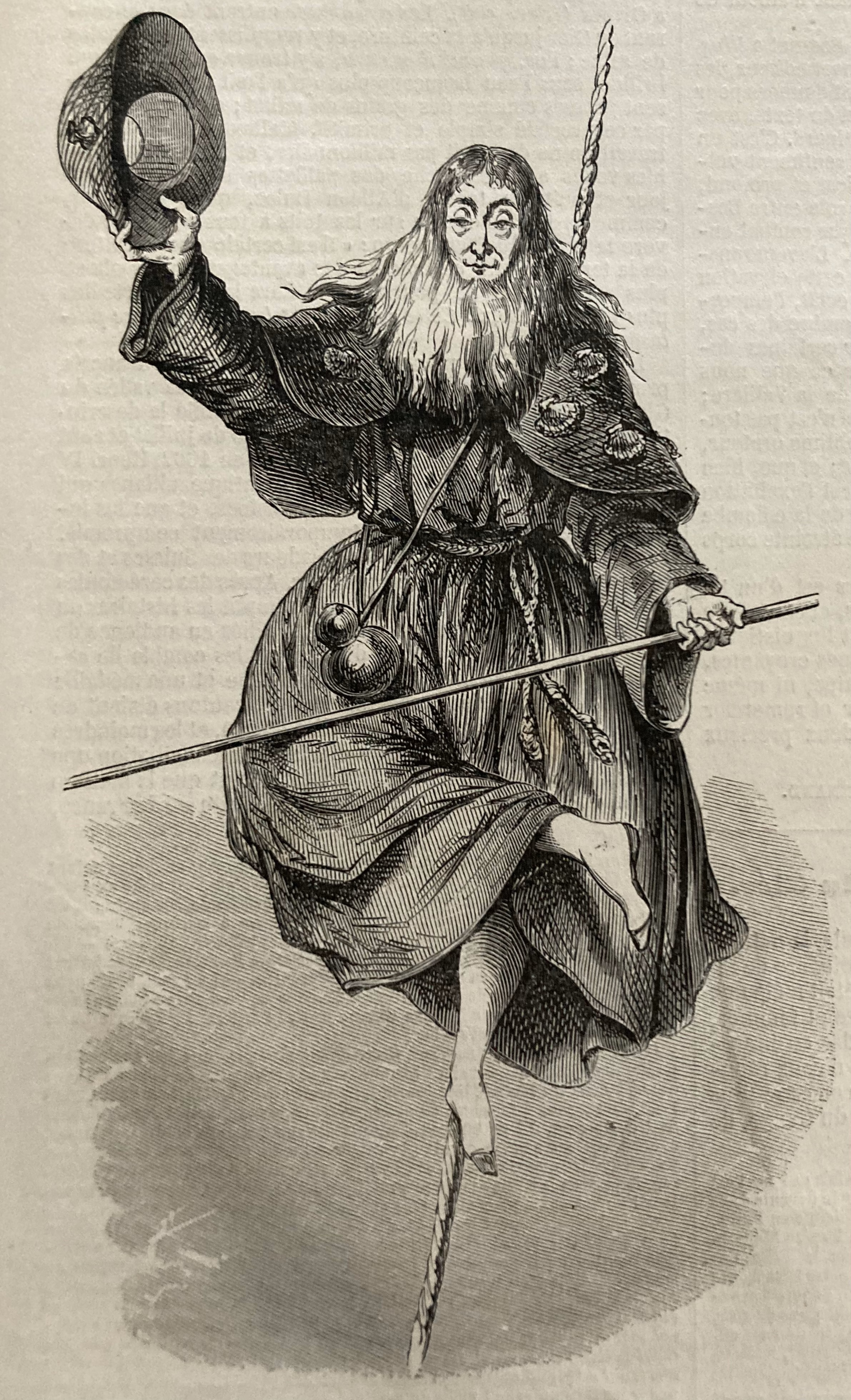
Madame Saqui in later life dressed as a pilgrim with a fake beard, performing on a tightrope

On 31 March 1814 the troops of Alexander I Tsar of Russia entered Paris following the Battle of Paris (1814) and occupied the French capital. Pietr Klavdievich Moussine-Pouchkine was a captain of the Russian Cossack troops stationed in Paris. He met and started an affair with Marguerite Saqui, which led to the birth of Ekaterina Petrovna Moussine-Pouchkine in Paris on 20 January 1816. The affair was hushed up by the Moussine-Pouchkine family, and Madame Saqui was amply compensated in return for a promise not to seek to see her daughter again. Ekaterina Petrovna was taken to Russia and brought up with her cousins, eventually becoming Princesse Troubetzkoy.

The end of the Napoleonic Wars opened up Britain's borders for French performers. In April 1816 Madame Saqui performed at the Covent Garden Theatre, "descending a tightrope stretched at an incline over the auditorium". This made her famous in Britain and her performance was drawn by George Cruikshank in A Wonderfull (sic) Thing from Paris, or, Madame Sacchi Gratifying John Bull's Curiosity. Following this success, she was hired to perform at Vauxhall Pleasure Gardens for parts of the next four years, where she appeared under the patronage of the Prince Regent.

She was a popular performer with her act including running down an inclined tightrope, stretched from a mast to one of the main walkways, in a storm of exploding fireworks. She performed with her brother Laurent Lalanne, her sister in law and her husband Pierre, but Madame Saqui was the main attraction. Her initial costume of tights in her skin colour proved to be too shocking for the British public, so she took to wearing pantaloons under her spangled dress and a hat embellished with ostrich feathers. This started a fashion trend, with women wearing headresses "a la Saqui". Her performances were described as "astonishing" and "perfectly unique" and as met with "unbounded approbation".

Saqui collaborated with pyrotechnician Sarah Hengler, often known as Madame Hengler, for the fireworks in her Vauxhall Gardens show and other British performances for a number of years. Saqui later performed in Paris with Hengler's son Michael, a successful tightrope dancer. Saqui's family troupe were the headline act at the Prince Regent's birthday extravaganza on 12 August 1816. Saqui also performed at Astley's Amphitheatre, as its indoor space ensured against disappointment "in consequence of the badness of the [British] weather".

In December 1816, Madame Saqui purchased the Café d'Apollon at 52 boulevard du Temple in Paris, and renamed it the Spectacle des Acrobates de Madame Saqui. She owned it until 1832, with her younger brother Baptiste acting as the manager. A combination of his poor management, coupled with a cholera outbreak in 1832 which saw 20,000 people die in Paris led to the theatre's bankruptcy and Saqui's financial ruin.

== Later life and death ==
Saqui continued to be a well known performer, coming up with new shows to keep up with audience demand. At the age of forty-seven, Saqui went back on the road, travelling to perform in Berlin, followed by a tour of Spain and across France. She was on the bill at l'Hippodrome in Paris 1852, described as ascending a rope on her head and was depicted in a cartoon of June that year showing her in a headstand on a rope with a caption "New technique invented by Mme Saqui for parting her hair".

Saqui continued to perform well into her seventies. At nearly seventy, she walked across part of the Champ-de-Mars on a rope for Napoleon III's birthday on 15 August 1853.

Saqui performed for one last time at the Hippodrome in 1862, age 76. She appeared dressed in a pilgrim's costume, with a long fake beard. After this she retired to Neuily, where she lived in straitened circumstances.

Saqui was said to have never fallen off the rope during a performance. She had been something of a celebrity for several decades. Her son Felix Lalanne also performed as a ropewalker and toured his act to Australia in the 1850s.

Saqui died in her home in Neuilly-sur-Seine, Hauts-de-Seine on 21 February 1866. She was buried in the 40th division of Père Lachaise Cemetery.

== Depictions in literature and art ==
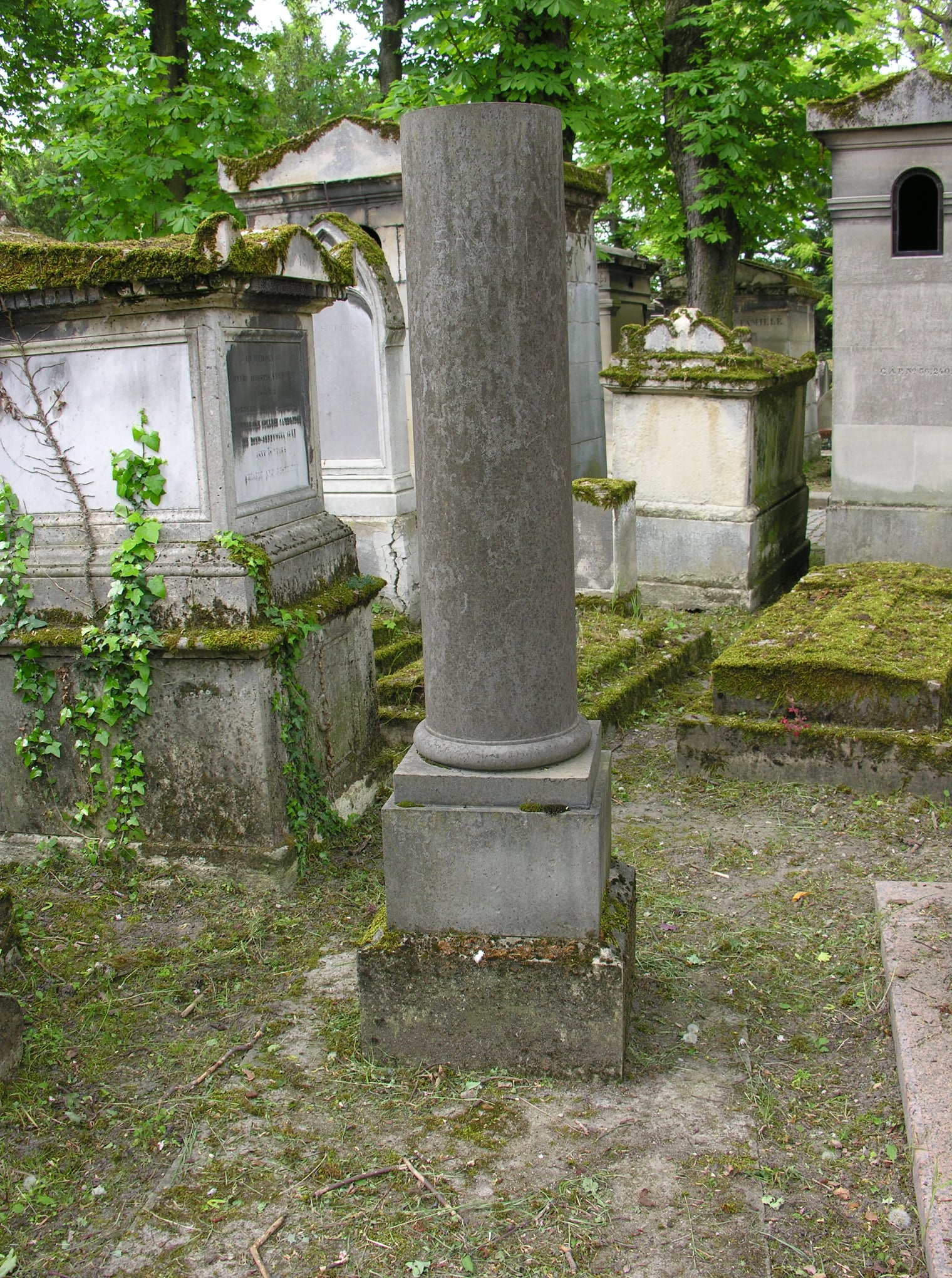
Marguerite Saqui's memorial in Père Lachaise Cemetery

Saqui is mentioned in the novel Vanity Fair by William Makepeace Thackeray as "Madame Saqui was about to mount skyward on a slack-rope ascending to the stars" as part of the entertainment at Vauxhall Gardens. Balzac mentions her in both Colonel Chabert and A Distinguished Provincial at Paris and Victor Hugo references her in Les Misérables.

Saqui was described in Tales of a Traveller by Washington Irving as "A woman who could dance the slack rope, and run up a cord from the stage to the gallery with fire-works all round her. She was seized on by the management with avidity; she was the saving of the great national theatre for the season. Nothing was talked of but Madame Saqui's fire-works and flame-colored pantaloons." In 1836 in Sketches by Boz, Charlies Dickens recalled "Madame Somebody ... who nobly devoted her life to the manufacture of fireworks, had so often been seen fluttering in the wind, as she called up a red, blue, or party-coloured light to illumine her temple!"

In 1853, when Georges-Eugène Haussmann began his renovation of Paris, commissioned by French Emperor Napoleon III, the satirical caricaturist Cham depicted Madame Saqui in a cartoon in Le Charivari magazine. She was drawn walking a high wire between the towers built to undertake the surveyors triangulation operation.

Images depicting Madam Saqui performing are held by the V&A, London Museum, National Galleries of Scotland, British Museum, Royal Collections Trust and the New York Public Library.

In 1907, the French journalist Paul Ginisty wrote her biography: Mémoires d'une danseuse de corde: Mme Saqui (1786–1866).

Saqui is the subject of a children's book, Madame Saqui: Revolutionary Rope Dancer. Written by Lisa Robinson and illustrated by Rebecca Green. Schwartz & Wade/Random, 2020.
