= Pyrotechnician =

Person responsible for fireworks

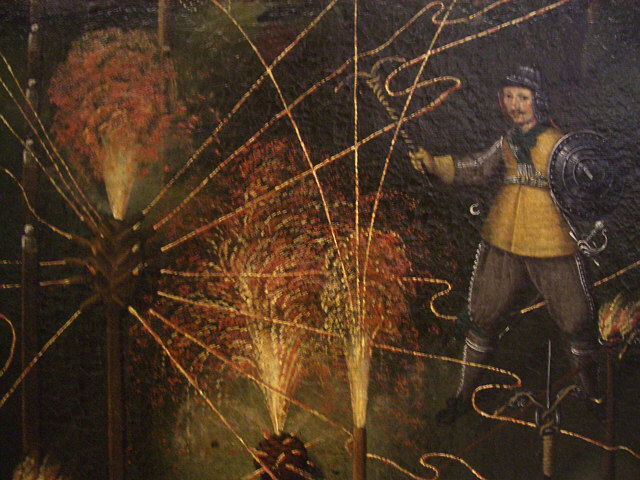
Painting of a 17th century pyrotechnician by Joseph Furttenbach (1665)

Pyrotechnicians are people who are responsible for the safe storage, handling, and functioning of pyrotechnics and pyrotechnic devices. Although the term is generally used in reference to individuals who operate pyrotechnics in the entertainment industry, it can include all individuals who regularly handle explosives. However, individuals who handle more powerful materials for commercial, demolition, or military applications are generally referred to as explosive technicians.

== Certification ==
It is becoming common in many countries and regions for individuals involved with the storage, handling, and operation of pyrotechnics to have some form of license or certification. The specific requirements for certification, along with any restrictions or prohibitions can vary from one jurisdiction to the next. Most jurisdictions do require some type of minimum professional fireworks training before being allowed to apply for certification.

=== Australia ===
In Australia, individuals using, handling or storing pyrotechnics must receive state government certification. All individuals must meet certain minimum requirements, including being at least 18 years of age and having received approved training before being issued a license. All pyrotechnicians are required to maintain a log of their experience and to submit this log annually during the license renewal process.

=== Canada ===
In Canada, individuals using, handling or storing pyrotechnics must receive government certification, administered by the Explosives Regulatory Division of Natural Resources Canada. All individuals must meet certain minimum requirements including being at least 18 years of age and having received government training before being issued a license. All pyrotechnicians, of any classification or certification, are required to maintain a log of their experience.

Certification for the use of proximate (indoor) pyrotechnics in Canada is separate from certification for display fireworks, and different government training and certification must be obtained. The available licenses for the use of proximate pyrotechnics are sub-divided into one of 6 categories.

==== Pyrotechnician ====
The Pyrotechnician classification is the primary classification in Canada. Individuals may use a restricted list of pyrotechnics individually, but may fabricate, handle, and set up a broader list of pyrotechnics typically prohibited to the pyrotechnician under the direct supervision of a higher-licensed individual. After two years of verifiable experience with a sufficient assortment of pyrotechnics, pyrotechnicians may apply for advancement to Senior Pyrotechnician certification. Certification is valid for five years.

==== Senior Pyrotechnician ====
The Senior Pyrotechnician classification is the intermediate classification in Canada. Individuals can supervise other pyrotechnicians and use any pyrotechnic device or product approved for use in Canada, and may also fabricate, handle, and set up a special-purpose or custom-fabricated pyrotechnics typically prohibited while under the direct supervision of a Special Effects Technician. After two years of verifiable experience with a sufficient assortment of pyrotechnics, pyrotechnicians may apply for advancement to Special Effects Technician certification. Certification is valid for five years.

==== Special Effects Technician ====
The Special Effects Technician classification is the most advanced classification in Canada. Individuals may use any pyrotechnic device or product approved for use in Canada, and may also fabricate, handle, and set up a special-purpose or custom-fabricated pyrotechnics device typically prohibited. A Special Effects Technician may also apply for special certification to use restricted material, such as detonating cord and exploding bolts. Certification is valid for five years.

==== Authorities Having Jurisdiction ====
Authorities Having Jurisdiction (AHJ) are individuals certified by the Explosive Regulatory Division to inspect and approve pyrotechnic events, including members of agencies associated with pyrotechnics such as fire departments and police forces. Unlike other certification classes, Authorities Having Jurisdiction are not required to pay fees to attend training sessions.

==== Out-of-Country Technicians ====
Pyrotechnicians based outside of Canada participating in the production of a pyrotechnics special effects event in Canada are required to obtain a Visitor Card at either a Pyrotechnician or Special Effects Technician equivalent level. A certified Canadian technician of the applicable class must also be employed for the production. Visitor Cards are valid for one year.

Alternately, pyrotechnicians based outside of Canada may apply for Canadian certification, provided they meet the minimum requirements and attend the Explosive Regulatory Division certification training.

=== United States ===
Many individual states implement their own certification or licensing programs. Not all states have reciprocity agreements in regards to honouring another state's certification, so it is not uncommon for pyrotechnicians to have certifications from multiple states. Certain states require certification to store, handle and operate fireworks but not proximate pyrotechnics; other states use the same certification for all pyrotechnics.

Professional pyrotechnic companies must be licensed by the Bureau of Alcohol, Tobacco, Firearms and Explosives with regard to importation, manufacturing, dealing in, receiving, or transporting display fireworks. A special category of driver's license is required for anyone who wishes to transport pyrotechnic materials by vehicle.
