= Jardin de Tivoli, Paris =

Park in Paris, France (1766 to 1842)

Coordinates: 48.87631°N 2.3287°E

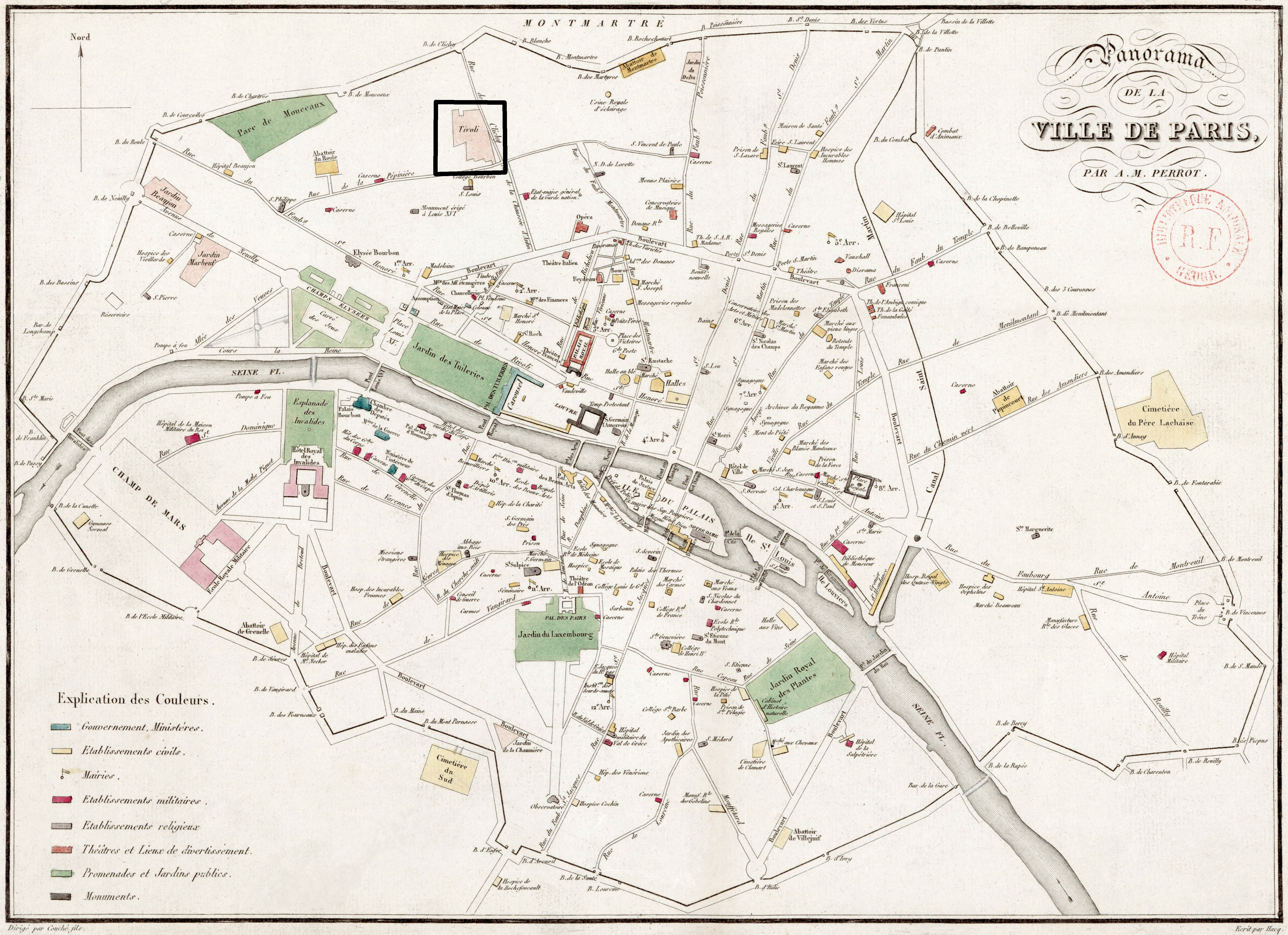
Location of the Tivoli gardens, 1826, from the Panorama de la ville de Paris par AM Perrot

The Tivoli gardens of Paris were amusement parks located near the current site of the Saint-Lazare station, named after the gardens of the Villa d'Este in Tivoli near Rome. There were several such gardens in succession between 1795 and 1842, none of which remain today.

== Folie-Boutin or Grand Tivoli (1795-1810) ==
In 1766, Simon Gabriel Boutin (1720-1794), a son of the wealthy farmer-general Boutin, had several houses built in a park of eight hectares, resplendent with rare plants, English, Italian, and Dutch gardens, a bowling green, and follies including false ruins, rocky promontories, and a waterfall. He named the ensemble Tivoli in honor of the gardens of the Villa d'Este in Rome, and the Folie Boutin, as it was often called, quickly became known for its splendid gardens. Its main entrance was located rue de Clichy, with a secondary entrance on rue Saint-Lazare. Two principal buildings were at n°102, la rue Saint-Lazare, and at n°27, la rue de Clichy. A pavilion, attributed to architect François Dominique Barreau de Chefdeville (1725-1765), housed a mineralogical collection. There on Thursdays Boutin received his friends, including painter Hubert Robert and architect Alexandre-Théodore Brongniart.

Boutin was guillotined on July 17, 1794, during the Reign of Terror, and the park put under sequestration. In 1795, the Folie Boutin opened to the public, formally taking the name of Tivoli and becoming the ancestor of amusement parks. During its time as a public garden, it was a favorite entertainment spot for Parisian high society, with amusements including panoramas, marionnettes, and magic lantern shows. Madame Saqui made her triumphant Parisian depute at the site, walking the tightrope accompanied by firework in 1806.

From 1796 to 1797 a counter-revolutionary society, called Clichy, occupied the site, but Boutin's heirs recovered Tivoli by a lawsuit in 1797. In 1799, a bath opened on the site (Les eaux thermales et minérales de Tivoli). Following the damage caused by the bivouacking of Napoleon's troops before their departure for Spain, the garden was closed on August 30, 1810.

== Folie-Richelieu or Second Tivoli (1810-1826) ==
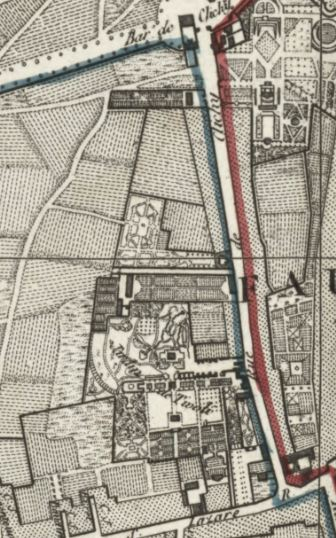
Map of the Tivoli garden in 1823

After the first Tivoli closed, the musician Baneux reopened it in more modest surroundings as the Folie-Richelieu or Second Tivoli, located on grounds between n°s 18 and 38 of the Rue de Clichy, extending to the Rue Blanche, on a site first created in 1730 by Marshal Richelieu for his own entertainment, and subsequently belonging to Fortunée Hamelin. In 1812, it was reintegrated with the Grand Tivoli site. Part of the land was sold to banker Pierre-Laurent Hainguerlot and subsequently the Spanish legation. The Second Tivoli disappeared in 1825, after an evening party given for Charles X's coronation on 7 June. On February 2, 1826, the Boutin heirs sold the land to Jonas-Philip Hagerman and Sylvain Mignon, when it became the Quartier de l'Europe.

== Folie-Bouxière or New Tivoli (1826-1842) ==
Étienne-Gaspard Robert opened the third Tivoli in 1826, which survived until 1842 when the rue Ballu and other streets were constructed. This was a true amusement park with roller coasters, pantomimes, labyrinths, and fireworks prepared by the master artificer Claude Ruggierri. Pigeon shooting, imported from England in 1831, resulted in the death of over 300,000 pigeons.

== See also ==
- Tivoli (disambiguation) for various places using this name.
- Chemins de fer de Paris à Lyon et à la Méditerranée, whose opulent head office was built on the former Tivoli grounds
