= Honeysuckle Rose (song) =

1929 song composed by Fats Waller

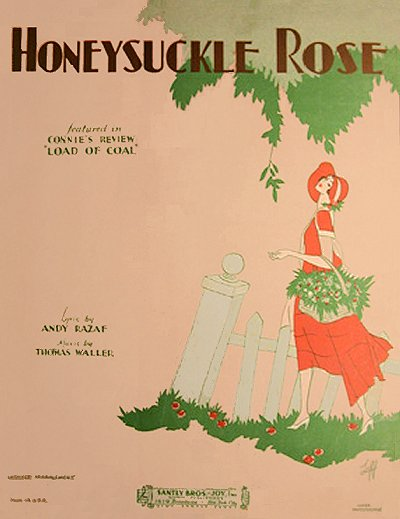
- Sheet music cover, 1929

Song
- Written: 1928
- Published: 1929 by Santley Bros
- Composer: Fats Waller
- Lyricist: Andy Razaf

"Honeysuckle Rose" is a 1929 song composed by Thomas "Fats" Waller with lyrics by Andy Razaf. It was introduced in the 1929 Off-Broadway revue "Load of Coal" at Connie's Inn as a soft-shoe dance number. Waller's 1934 recording was inducted into the Grammy Hall of Fame in 1999.

During a visit to the West Side of Asbury Park, New Jersey in 1928, Waller wrote the song with Razaf at 119 Atkins Avenue in a home that still stands today.

== Renditions ==
- Fletcher Henderson (1932)
- Fats Waller (1934), (1937) and (1941)
- Red Norvo (1935, originally issued on COL 3059-D)
- Mildred Bailey (1935), Mildred Bailey and Her Alley Cats (Parlophone R 2201, England)
- Count Basie (1937)
- Ella Fitzgerald (1963) on Ella and Basie!
- Coleman Hawkins, with Benny Carter, Django Reinhardt, Stéphane Grappelli and others (1937)
- Fats Waller, Bunny Berigan, Dick McDonough and George "Georgia" Wettling, on A Jam Session at Victor (1937)
- Earl Hines (1937)
- Louis Armstrong (1938), Satch Plays Fats (1955, Columbia Records)
- Fats Waller, with Louis Armstrong and Jack Teagarden (recorded live October 1938, and released on Striding in Dixieland [Folkways Records FW02816 / FJ S2816] in 1981)
- Benny Goodman – The Famous 1938 Carnegie Hall Jazz Concert (recorded live January 16, 1938, originally released in 1950) Featuring solos by Benny Goodman, Harry James, Lester Young, Buck Clayton, Count Basie, Johnny Hodges and Harry Carney.
- Louis Jordan (1939)
- The King Cole Trio, March 14, 1941, April 11, 1946, July 2, 1947
- Harry Parry, Dave Wilkins, Woolf Phillips, Bobby Midgley, Art Thompson, Aubrey Franks, Joe Deniz and Charlie Short, as part of the First English Public Jam Session, November 16, 1941
- Lena Horne – In musical film Thousands Cheer (M-G-M, 1943)
- Teddy Wilson (1944)
- Sarah Vaughan - At Mister Kelly's (1957)
- Eva Cassidy - Live at Blues Alley (1996)
- Jane Monheit - Taking a Chance on Love (album) (2004)
- Alexis Cole and Bucky Pizzarelli – A Beautiful Friendship (2015)

== See also ==
- List of 1920s jazz standards
