= Grosvenor House Hotel =

Hotel in Mayfair, London, England

Coordinates: 51°30′35″N 0°09′20″W

JW Marriott Grosvenor House London
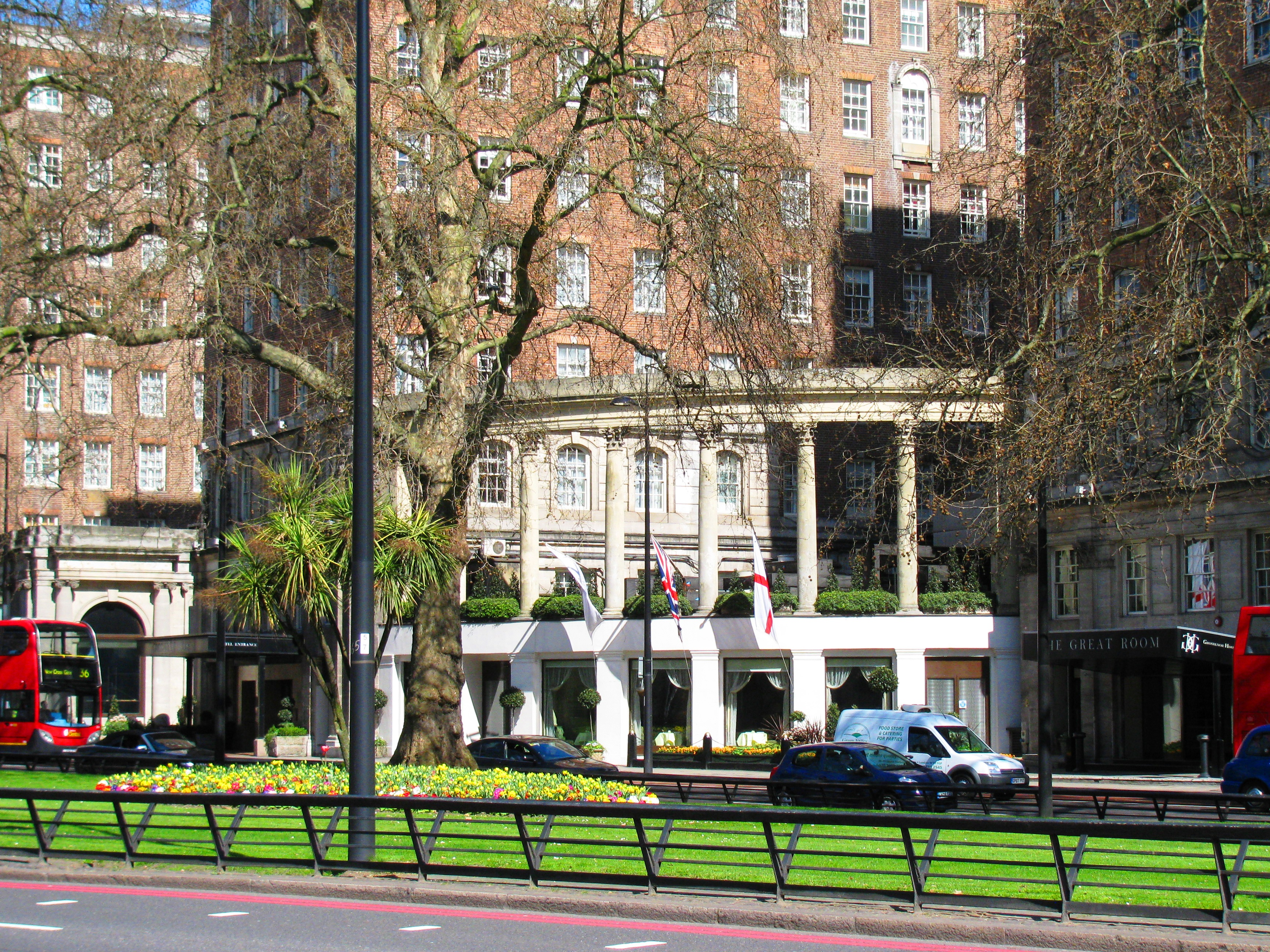
- View of the hotel from Park Lane

General information
- Location: 86–90 Park Lane, Mayfair, London W1K 7TN, England
- Opened: 1929
- Owner: Katara Hospitality
- Operator: JW Marriott Hotels

Technical details
- Floor count: 8

Other information
- Number of rooms: 420
- Number of suites: 74
- Number of restaurants: 2
- Parking: Yes

Website
- Official website

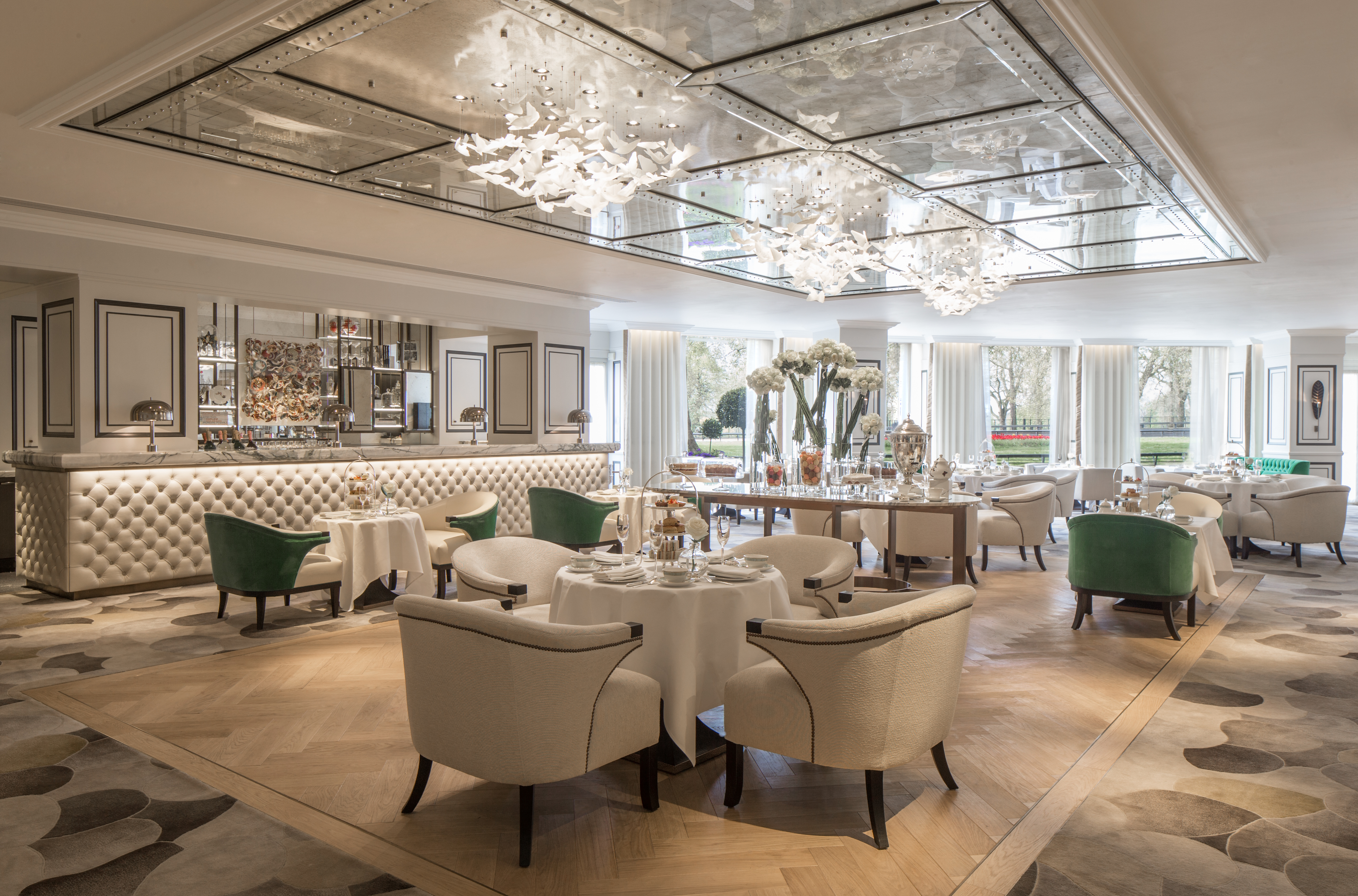
The Park Room

JW Marriott Grosvenor House London, formerly the Grosvenor House Hotel, is a luxury hotel that opened in 1929 in the Mayfair area of London, England. Facing Hyde Park, the hotel was built on the site of the former 19th century aristocratic Grosvenor House residence. The hotel is managed by JW Marriott Hotels, which is a brand of Marriott International, and it is owned by Katara Hospitality.

== History ==
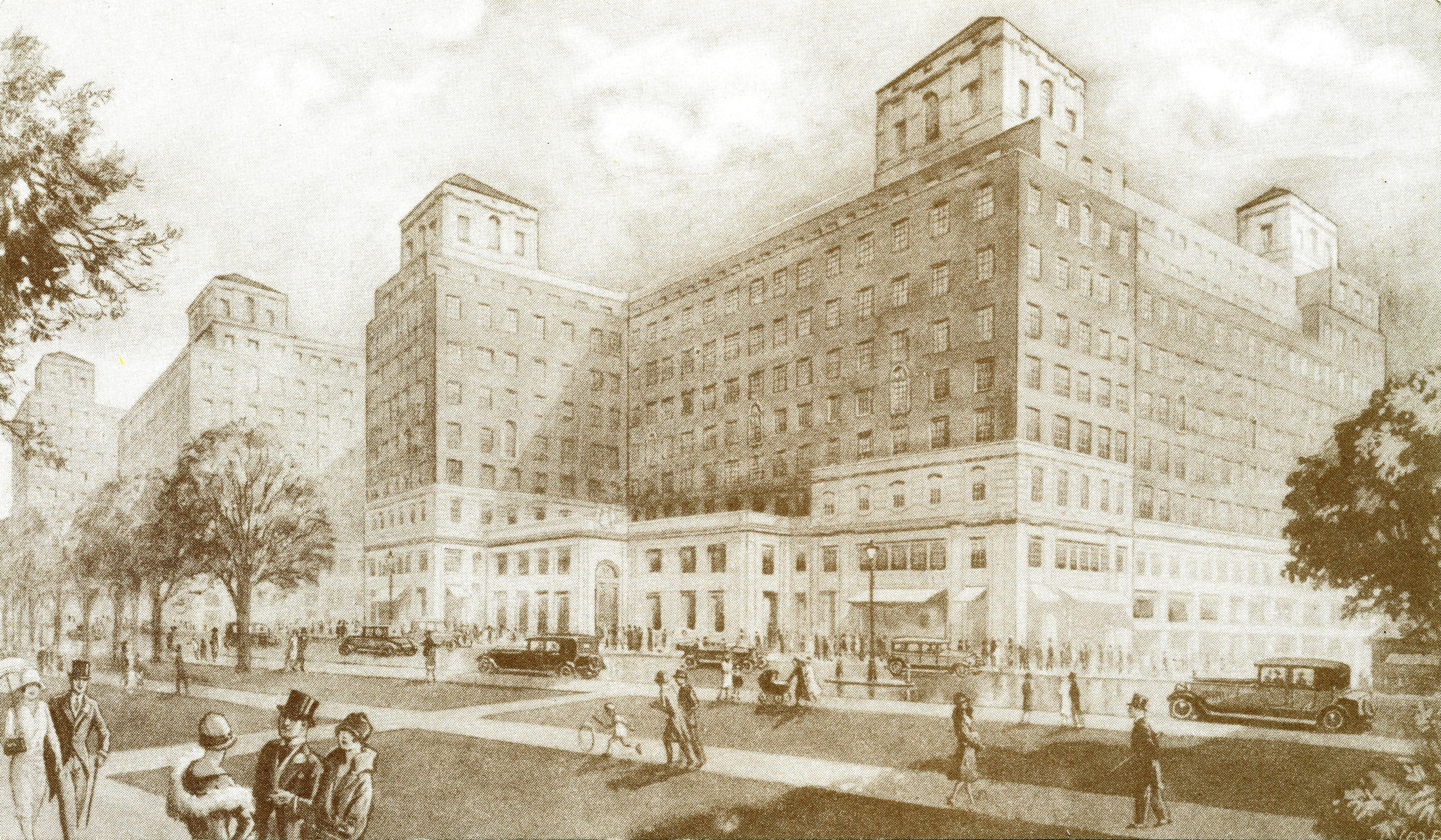
Grosvenor House Hotel, 1920s postcard illustration

The Grosvenor House Hotel was built in the 1920s and opened in 1929 on the site of Grosvenor House, the former London residence of the Dukes of Westminster, whose family name is Grosvenor. The hotel owed its existence to Arthur Octavius Edwards, who conceived and built it, then presided over it as chairman for 10 years.

A.H. Jones had worked for Edwards in Doncaster. In January 1929, six months after the completion of the first block of apartments, and six months before completion of the hotel, Edwards brought Jones to Grosvenor House as accountant. In 1936, at the age of 29, Jones became general manager of Grosvenor House. Apart from the war years, when he served with the Royal Artillery and later in the NAAFI, Jones held this position until he retired in 1965.

The hotel gained widespread publicity in 1934 when Edwards named his de Havilland DH.88 Comet racer after it and won the MacRobertson England-Australia Air Race. The restored plane still flies in its original livery with the Shuttleworth Collection.

Grosvenor House managed to have a 'good' World War II. Ten thousand sandbags and five miles of blackout material protected the building, and its entertaining space was used in the war effort. The Great Room initially became home to the Officers' Sunday Club and then, in 1943, to the US officers' mess. Generals Dwight D. Eisenhower and George S. Patton were regular visitors.. Furthermore, Captain Joe Bonenti, who served in World War II, was the assistant manager during the 1940s.

The original scheme for the hotel was not finally realised until the 1950s because Bruno, Baron Schröder, who had acquired the lease of 35, Park Street in about 1910, had refused to give it up to Edwards. Schröder remained in the house until his death in 1940, and permission to demolish the house was finally given in 1956. The house was replaced with a 92-bedroom extension, which was officially opened in 1957 by the Chancellor of the Exchequer, Peter Thorneycroft.

The hotel underwent a four-year renovation and restoration costing £142 million, and it reopened in 2008. This included a full refurbishment of all restaurants, guest rooms, health facilities, and public areas. The Great Room, Ballroom, Court Suite, restaurants, bars, meeting spaces and 494 guest rooms can accommodate a total of over 6,000 people.

In 2010, Indian conglomerate Sahara India Pariwar purchased the hotel from the Royal Bank of Scotland for £470 million. Sahara India Pariwar also owned a controlling stake in New York's famous Plaza Hotel from 2012 to 2018.

Grosvenor House is managed by the JW Marriott Hotels brand of Marriott International. The hotel drew protests in 2017 when it hosted the annual gathering of the Aerospace Defence Security group (ADS), a trade association which represents arms companies. Campaigners stood outside the hotel and held banners protesting the role of some ADS member companies in the arming of Saudi Arabia during its attack on Yemen.

In April 2017, Sahara India Pariwar turned down an offer of more than £600 million for the hotel from British billionaires David and Frederick Barclay, before finally selling the hotel to US-based Ashkenazy Acquisition Corporation for an undisclosed sum. In November 2018, it was announced that Katara Hospitality (owned by the Qatar Investment Authority) was buying the hotel for an undisclosed sum.

== Facilities ==
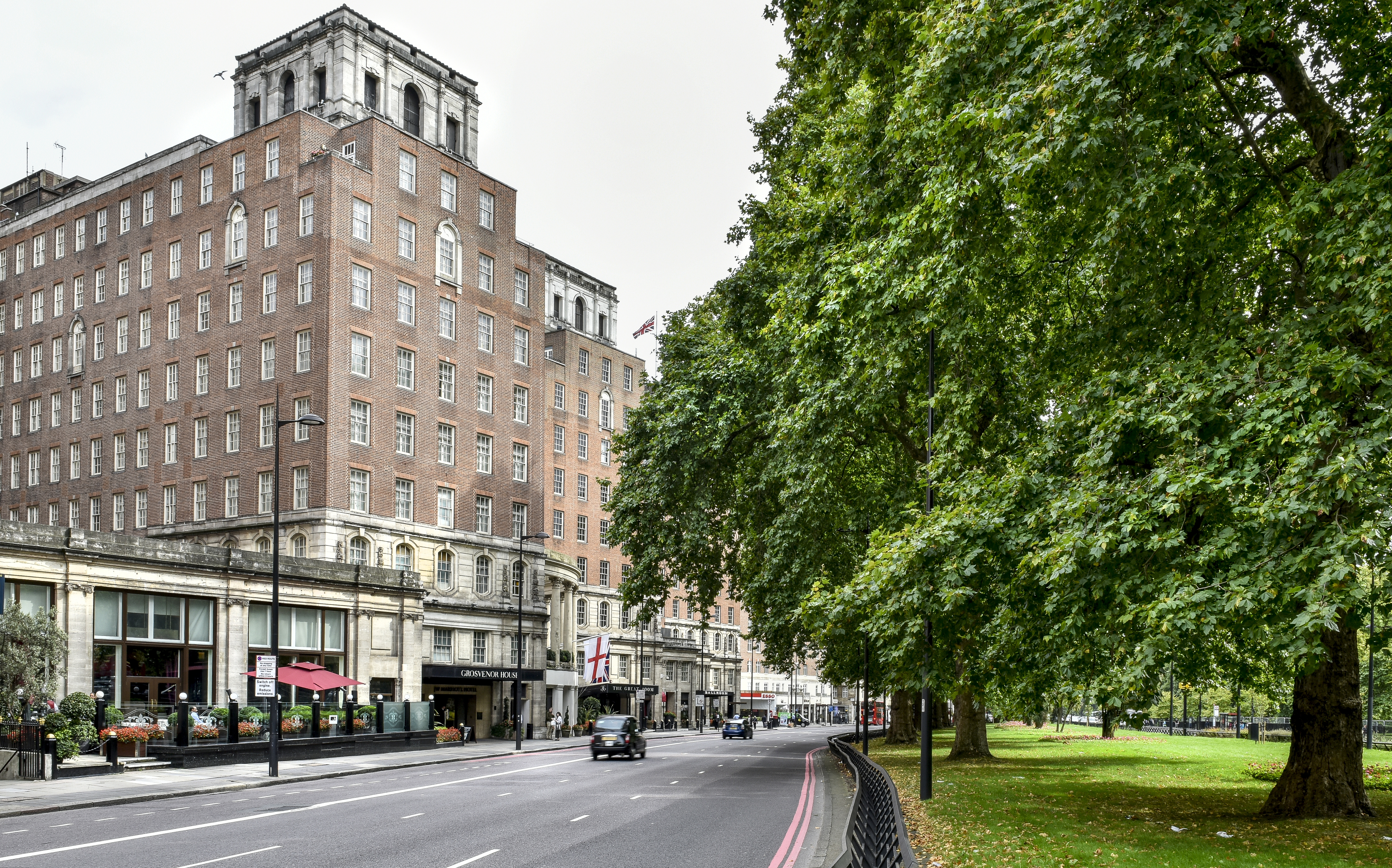
Hotel viewed from Park Lane

Grosvenor House was the first hotel in London at that time to have a separate bathroom and entrance lobby for each bedroom, and running iced water in every bathroom. When the hotel first opened on 14 May 1929, it was also the headquarters of the International Sportsmen's Club. Its facilities included Victorian-style Turkish baths, a swimming pool, squash courts and a gymnasium.

The hotel has a pedestrian entrance on Park Lane in Mayfair, but this is not the 'main/courtyard' entrance, which is actually on Park Street. The official address of the hotel is 86–90, Park Lane.

== Great Room ==
The Great Room (which is a separate room from the Ballroom) at the Grosvenor House is the venue of many prominent awards evenings such as The Asian Awards, Pride of Britain Awards, and the O2 Silver Clef Awards, as well as charity balls and other events, and it is often seen on British television. For example, the UK Chamber of Shipping hosts an annual maritime gala dinner at the hotel. Since the 1930s, the Great Room has hosted the world's oldest charitable ball, the Royal Caledonian Ball, and it is one of the largest ballrooms in Europe, with a maximum capacity of 2,000 seated (200 10-person tables) or 1,100 theatre style.

Although now not used as such, the Great Room was originally built as an ice-rink, and much of the machinery lies dormant under the current flooring. In 1933, Princess Elizabeth, the future Queen Elizabeth II, learnt to skate at the hotel at just seven years of age. Sonja Henie, Cecilia Colledge, and other famous skaters frequently displayed their skill. International ice hockey matches were played there, and the newly formed Grosvenor House Canadian hockey team, recruited from Canadians living in London, played the Queen's Ice Hockey Club on the rink, the first of a series of matches against teams from the United Kingdom and the Continent.

Anticipating competition from other ice rinks, the rink was converted in 1935 into a banquet hall measuring 1,902 square metres (20,454 square feet).

== Music ==
Dance music was first relayed from the hotel for BBC national broadcasts in 1929, conducted by American bandleader Jack Harris, sometimes deputised by Joseph Meeus. Sydney Lipton took over as resident bandleader in 1933 and conducted at the hotel most nights, with the regular radio broadcasts continuing. Among Lipton's musicians were the instrumentalists Ted Heath, George Evans, Billy Munn, Harry Hayes, Bill McGuffie, Freddy Gardner, Max Goldberg and Max Abrams, and the singers Anona Wynn, Primrose Hayes, Les Allen, and Chips Chippindall, as well as Lipton's daughter Celia. Lipton was called up to serve with the Royal Corps of Signals in May 1941 and Billy Mayerl stepped in as leader. Lipton returned after the war and continued to lead the hotel's orchestra until 1967.

== Tenants ==
Richard Corrigan rents space within the hotel and runs the restaurant Corrigan's Mayfair.
