= George Fierstone =

English jazz drummer

George Fierstone (14 November 1916 in London – 13 April 1984 in London) was an English jazz drummer.

Fierstone played with a traveling revue in 1931, then played in London with such bandleaders as Bert Ambrose, Harry Roy, Sid Millward (1938), Frank Weir (1944), and Harry Hayes (1944–46). During this time he also did copious work as a studio musician and played in the Heralds of Swing in 1939. He worked in an RAF dance band during World War II, and after the war's end this ensemble performed and recorded as The Skyrockets from 1946 to 1953, accompanying Ella Fitzgerald and Frank Sinatra among others. He continued to work freelance into the 1980s.

== See also ==
- First English Public Jam Session
