= First English Public Jam Session =

1941 music event

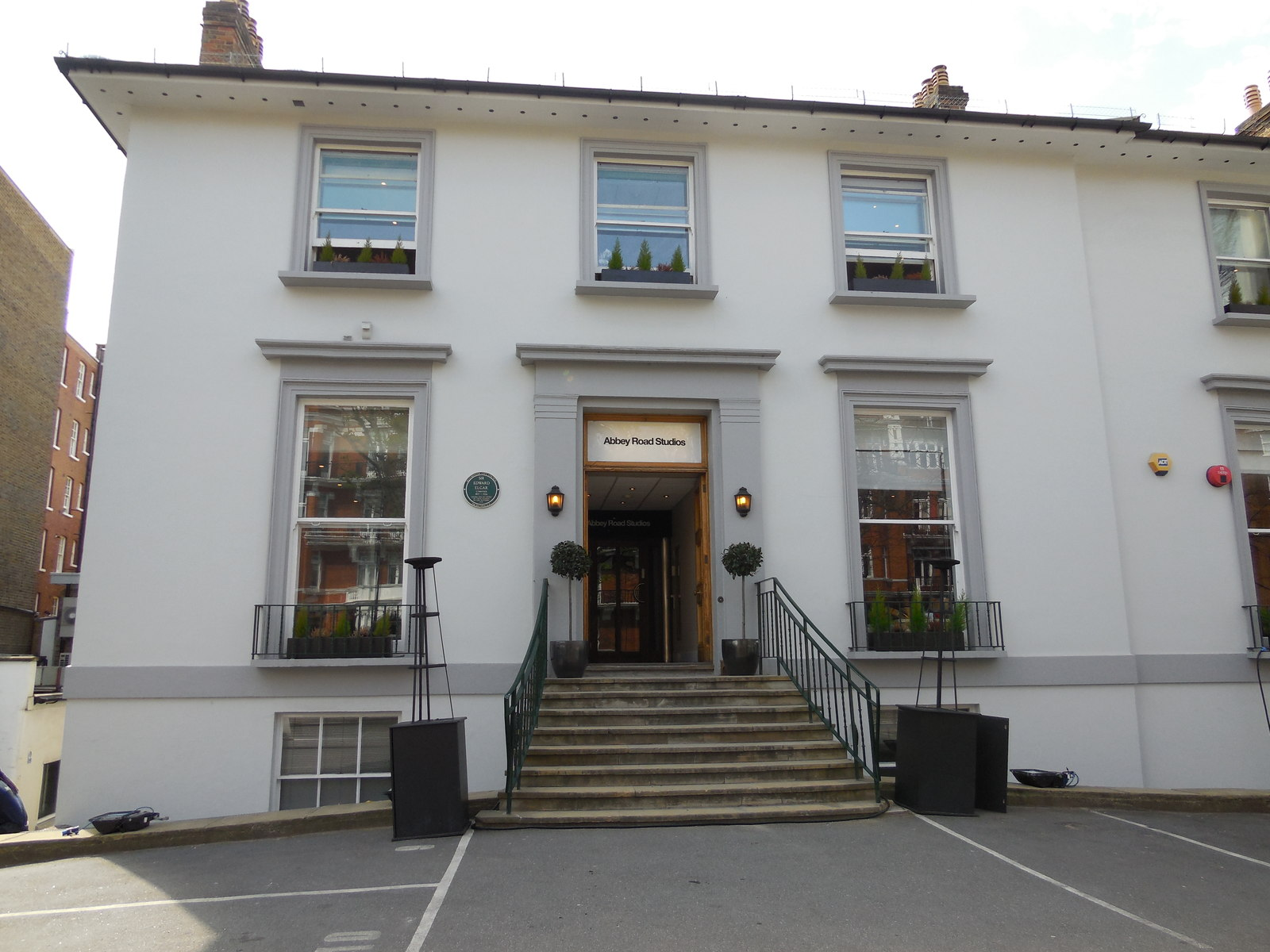
EMI Recording Studios (pictured 2013), the recording location of the First English Public Jam Session

The First English Public Jam Session was a live jam session performed by several different all-star octets made up of British swing musicians, held at EMI Recording Studios (since renamed Abbey Road Studios) on 16 November 1941. The session, which was initiated and sponsored by Melody Maker, H.M.V., the BBC and the No. 1 Rhythm Club, was the culmination of developments in wartime London that saw jams between jazz musicians grow in popularity in 'bottle-party' clubs, Rhythm Clubs and on BBC radio, the latter through their programme Radio Rhythm Club.

Performed before an invited audience of 1,000 fans and musicians, the jam session was promoted as the greatest British example ever by Melody Maker, who operated a committee to select the contributing musicians, many of whom were young. Part of the event's aim was to present authentic British jazz in a positive light, with jam sessions being seen as an authentic presentation of jazz. The session, which lasted three hours, ran through several standards and included 24 musicians including three clarinettists and band leaders – Harry Parry, Carl Barriteau and Frank Weir – reflecting the influence of Artie Shaw and Benny Goodman at the time. Five of the contributors were Black, with the event now notable for its racial integration.

Three records were released by H.M.V. containing recordings from the jam session. Extended versions of "Tea for Two" and "St. Louis Blues" were spread over two sides of a ten-inch record each, whereas "Honeysuckle Rose" and "I Found a New Baby" featured on each side of a twelve-inch record. The BBC also broadcast highlights on Radio Rhythm Club. The First English Public Jam Session has since been viewed as a historic event in the history of British jazz, and has been dubbed the first dance music jam session ever recorded in public. Some critics note that the session and its H.M.V. releases prefigured Norman Granz's Jazz at the Philharmonic events. The English jam session also led to a follow-up, "The Melody Maker–Columbia Rally of 1947", six years later.

== Background ==
During the late 1930s and into World War II, a heavier demand for nightlife in London helped with the acceleration of British jazz, providing a hothouse for late-night 'jam session' culture between jazz musicians in London nightclubs, where 'bottle-party' (or 'drinking-club') culture – which had been growing since 1932 – flourished "in the atmosphere of physiological tension and boredom in the early months of the war." Concurrently, jam sessions also became popular in the more formal premises of Rhythm Clubs, which were originally established across the United Kingdom as a means for jazz aficionados to share their record collections. Rhythm Clubs helped increase respect for jazz among music critics and held the belief that the spontaneity of jam sessions resulted in a more authentic style of jazz performance than the meticulous arrangements of British dance bands.

BBC radio refused to broadcast performances from "vice-ridden" premises, but certain projects circumvented the ban, including the four live records of Cyril Blake playing at the Jig's Club released by Regal Zonophone Records in December 1941, capturing "the raw excitement of the venue"; these cheaply-priced records were broadcast on the BBC, albeit on the niche Radio Rhythm Club, which debuted in June 1940 and focused on records, jam sessions, discussions and guest contributions from professional performers and critics, sharing with the Rhythm Clubs a belief in jam sessions as an authentic signifier of jazz. Demand for jazz accelerated as the war progressed, thus that numerous musicians from the bottle-party sessions became regular fixtures at the BBC, who "promoted them to the airwaves in the name of morale." The authors Will Studdert and Bruce Johnson comment that the First English Public Jam Session was the culmination of these developments. The author Christina L. Baade writes that the First English Public Jam Session – and that of the Cavendish Swing Concert of 25 January 1942 – were inspired by Harry Parry's jam sessions on Radio Rhythm Club.

== The event ==
=== Planning ===
Despite the wartime conditions, the "First English Public Jam Session" was organised by Melody Maker, H.M.V., the BBC and the No. 1 Rhythm Club, as a musical gathering of British jazz players. (Note: Melody Maker have written that the jam session was sponsored by themselves and H.M.V.) Melody Maker promoted it as "the greatest British jam session ever", stressing its informal and spontaneous qualities but also informing readers that the event was precisely organised by a committee who selected the contributing musicians, arranging them into different 'bands' and editing the resultant recordings "to provide the greatest jazz and show British musicians in the best possible light." In previews, the magazine emphasised that the session was a celebration of British talent, stressing that "British musicians can play the right sort of jazz in the right sort of atmosphere." This has been seen as evoking not only the rhetoric that surrounded Benny Carter's 1937 London show, but also a desire for "self-sufficiency in British jazz performance", arguably reflecting "a nationalist stance at time of war."

Perhaps due to its pursuit of authenticity, the committee favoured young, up-and-coming musicians who, although obscure to the wider public, were known on the London jazz scene where jam sessions were popular. Melody Maker announced 24 musicians, five of whom were Black – the Welsh guitarists Frank and Joe Deniz, Trinidadian clarinettist-saxophonist Carl Barriteau, and West Indies-born trumpeters Dave Wilkins and Leslie "Jiver" Hutchinson. Although racial integration was not a stated aim of the jam, the relatively high number of black contributors made it comparable to similar performances at the Rhythm Club. Other musicians were from the wider British Empire, whereas two of them were Dutch.

=== Recording ===
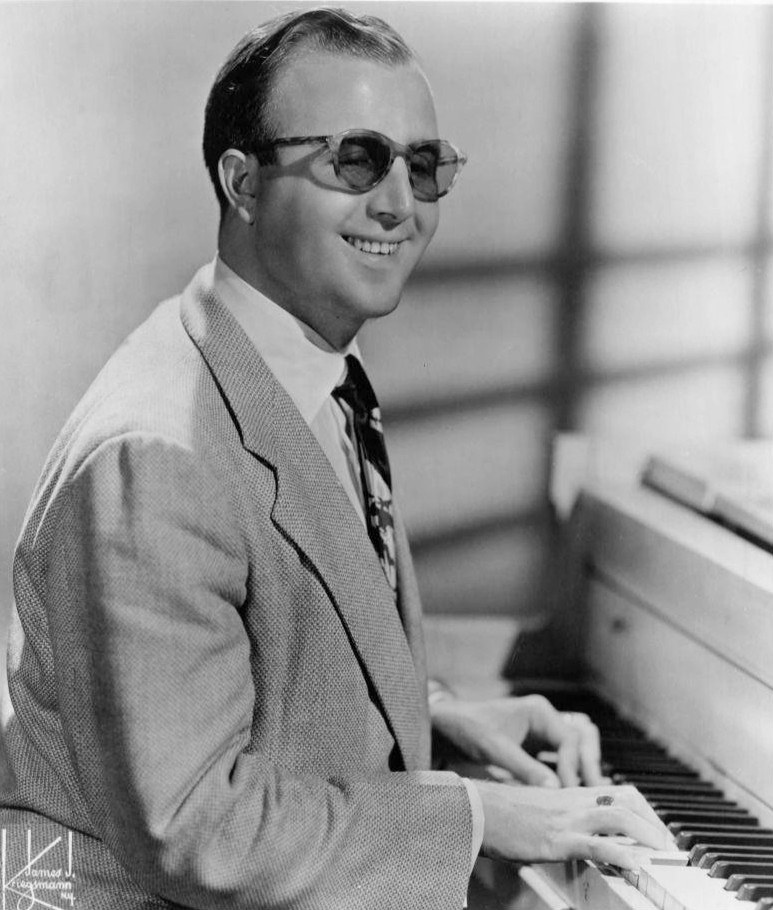
George Shearing attended as an audience member but was later invited on stage.

Using the jam session format in a recording studio, the event took place on the Sunday afternoon of 16 November 1941, at the EMI Recording Studios at Abbey Road, London, before a seated, invited audience of 1,000 spectators, effectively rendering it a 'special concert' akin to earlier such examples arranged by Melody Maker. The audience included a plethora of dance band musicians and leaders, publishers and numerous other 'rhythm fans', including Brian Rust. The event was stewarded by a teenage Peter W. G. Powell, later known as an aficionado of London wartime jazz, who comments that jam sessions were typically only heard in drinking clubs. George Shearing was also in the audience, but was later invited onstage to jam with a group of former sidemen for the late Ken "Snakehips" Johnson. Rust later described the audience as "appreciative but hardly very discerning." Thousands of Radio Rhythm Club fans applied for tickets.

The gathered all-star musicians, described by Jazz Journal as comprising the majority of available London jazzmen, were arranged into several groupings of eight players of identical instrumentation. These octets, which Rust describes as "composed of leading West End dance-band musicians", included famous players like trumpeters Wilkins and Kenny Baker and saxophonists Barriteau and Buddy Featherstonhaugh. Further instrumentalists included Harry Parry, Maurice Burman, Birmingham drummer Tommy Bromley, guitarist Jean-Pierre Sasson, melodic clarinettist Frank Weir, and additional saxophonists Len Newberry and Aubrey Frank, the latter of whom was conscripted into the Royal Air Force the following day, though he later escaped his duties to play with Lew Stone and Johnny Claes. Although there was a level of fluidity between the lineups, racial integration was foregrounded by Barriteau leading one octet which also featured Frank Deniz.

The session lasted three hours and featured the octets playing through numerous old standards. Rust described the results as "raucous ensembles into which were sandwiched chorus after chorus from each of the front-line instruments and the piano, backed by a leaden rhythm section that really did hit the listener over the head. Many of the soloists even then, and in wartime London too, seemed to be reaching out for something beyond the comprehension of most of us who were present." Each of the three octets whose jams were later released included a clarinetist, reflecting the dominant influence of Benny Goodman and Artie Shaw at the time. The influence of Shaw is notably evident on Barriteau, who led one of the two bands. Steve Voce of The Independent writes that, although Shaw's influence is "very obvious" on Barriteau's playing in the session, "close listening reveals that where Shaw was precise and immaculate in some of his uniquely complex runs on the instrument, Barriteau cleverly skidded over the points where such ambitious work was required."

== Release and discography ==
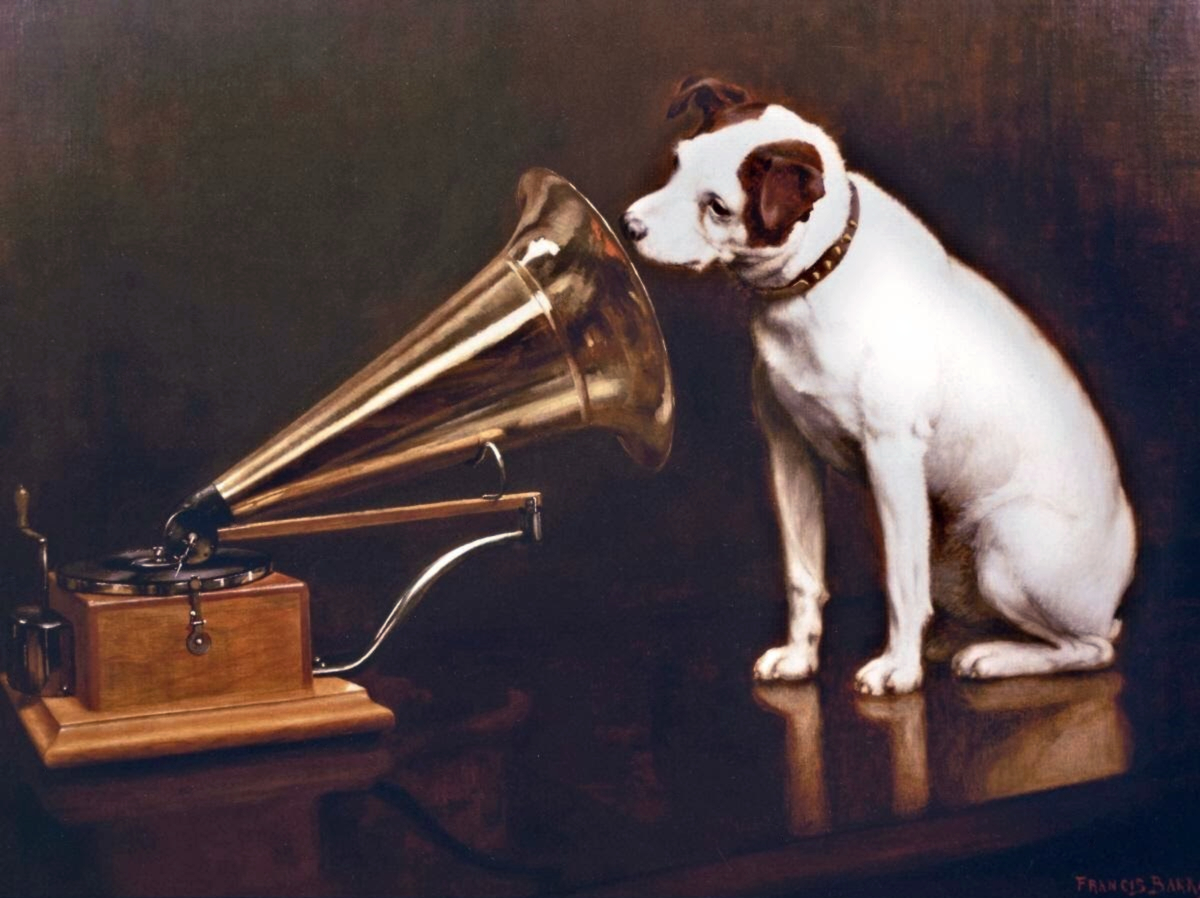
Logo of His Master's Voice, who sponsored the jam session and released three records of material from it.

In December 1941 and January 1942, H.M.V. released three records of recordings from the jam session, each dedicated to a different octet. The extended performances of "Tea for Two" and "St. Louis Blues" were issued in separate parts over two sides of a 78rpm ten-inch record each, whereas "Honeysuckle Rose" and "I Found a New Baby" – both by a group featuring Parry – appeared on one side each of a twelve-inch record. (Note: H.M.V.'s catalogue numbers for the releases were B-9249 ("Tea for Two"), B-9250 ("St. Louis Blues") and C-3269 ("Honeysuckle Rose" / "I Found a New Baby")) By 1944, Dick Katz's playing on the "Tea for Two" record had become his best-known work, alongside his stints at the Feldman Swing Club. Much of the material recorded at the session was unreleased, including that of the fourth octet, led by Featherstonhaugh.

The BBC also broadcast parts of the session on radio, when, in November 1942, Radio Rhythm Club dedicated a special episode to the session in which both the released recordings and several unissued "special recordings" were played. The jam session made almost no impact on the American market, especially on the West Coast, as major American record labels were "unaware of what their principal European counterpart was doing."

The extended version of "Tea for Two" from the jam session later appeared on the Kenny Baker compilation Birth of a Legend '41–'46 (1998). In 2010, it featured on Larkin's Jazz, a compilation album of jazz tunes beloved of British poet Philip Larkin. "Honeysuckle Rose" features on the compilation Presenting... The Best of the British Jazz Groups (2000). In April 2012, "Tea for Two" was played on the final instalment of BBC Radio 3's Great British Jazz Recordings, featuring "highlights of British jazz records from the 1930s to the 1960s", whereas "Honeysuckle Rose" was played on BBC Radio 6 Music's October 2024 special Celebrating Caribbean Jazz. "St. Louis Blues" also saw radio play on Spinitron's Jay's Radio Hour in 2025.

== Reception ==
Baade argues that the mass scale and personnel of the First English Public Jam Session confirmed the centrality of Radio Rhythm Club to British swing culture, especially as members and guests of the RRC Sextet figured heavily in the event. Melody Maker editor Edgar Jackson believed the session proved British jazz can much better than "most of even the people who are in closest touch with it believed possible", and that this "high-profile event" was a success in exemplifying the greatest homegrown talents. A Melody Maker readers poll in 1942 voted Parry as the best clarinetist in the country, with 15% more votes than Barriteau. In 1947, the magazine reflected that the session comprised "little jam groups drawn from a 'pool' of the finest swing stars in Britain.".

Among those that attended, Larkin – who missed the end of the event to catch a bus – described the jam session as "really very fine – not that the Jam was of a very high standard, but one occasionally got visions of what a real American one would be like." Writing in 1990, Rust opined that "[nothing] of any great consequence" resulted from the jam session, but conceded that it was a "thrilling" opportunity for audience members "to witness a recording being made, and by their idols, among them Harry Parry, whose clarinet was as cold and damp as the weather outside, and Dave Wilkins, a West Indian trumpet player who did at least try to bring a little sanity and liveliness into what was otherwise a pretty dreary proceeding." Rust instead suggests that an unnamed test record on Vocalion Records was a superior example of a spontaneous jam session record.

== Legacy ==
=== Reappraisal ===
The First English Public Jam Session has been described as a historic, epochal event, especially an "historic day in the history of British Jazz." Melody Maker called it "the first public recorded jazz session ever held in the history of dance music", though AllMusic speculates on earlier English jam sessions, whereas Jon Stratton and Nabeel Zuberi deem it "[the] most significant public statement of racial integration in jazz in the aftermath of the Café bombing." Specifically, they comment on it establishing a progressive model for integration and lack of racial discrimination which, as soon demonstrated by the 'Your Swing Concert' event, "was both expected and demanded by jazz fans", although they noted that the Black British identities of Barriteau, Wilkisn, Hutchinson and Frank and Joe Deniz were subsumed on the jam session "within a non-specific and all-encompassing Britishness, itself primarily an attempt to at once emulate, surmount and suppress the fundamental American identity of the music." The "Tea for Two" and "St. Louis Blues" H.M.V. records, the former showcasing a contingent led by Berriteau, have been described by Colin Larkin as "highly influential".

Several authors, including Alyn Shipton, have described the First English Public Jam Session as prefiguring Norman Granz's "Jazz at the Philharmonic" events, launched in 1944 to present jam sessions in a concert format and then disseminate them on record releases. Just as two of the English jam records, for the extended versions of "Tea for Two" and "St. Louis Blues" respectively, split the performances into two parts over successive sides, Granz also had to divide up the performances from some of the first Philharmonic concerts for records in the pre-LP era. Shipton contends that, due to the English jam session of 1941, Granz's concept was unexpectedly "most successfully pre-empted in Britain". (Note: Duke Ellington biographer John Fass Morton writes: "Granz would not be the first to release a live recording. In November 1941 Britain's HMV had released two 78s with extended performances from a live jazz concert. Granz was nonetheless ahead of the curve in the United States.")

Shipton also comments that the decision to commercially release parts of the English Public Jam Session made it unlike other notable "documentary recordings" of jams done previously, such as Benny Goodman's and Duke Ellington's respective 1938 and 1943 concerts at Carnegie Hall, which were not released until 1950 (The Famous 1938 Carnegie Hall Jazz Concert) and as a 1960s Italian bootleg (later The Carnegie Hall Concerts: January 1943), respectively, and Eddie Condon's Town Hall jam sessions, which began in 1942 but were not initially commercially released, with the eventual releases that appeared largely stemming from amateur recordings of live broadcasts of the sessions. Jon Stratton compares it to Milt Gabler's 1930s public jam sessions in New York, several of which were released through Gabler's label Commodore, but noted that Goodman's 1938 Carnegie Hall jam session, as issued in 1950, effectively presented "an integrated big band", with Goodman's white sidemen and black guests from the bands of Count Basie and Duke Ellington, adding: "Perhaps there is some sense in which the First English Public Jam Session was an attempt to emulate these developments in the USA."

=== Follow-ups ===
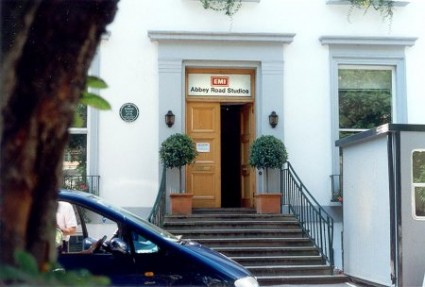
The use of EMI Recording Studios (pictured 2010) was retained for "The Melody Maker-Columbia Jazz Rally of 1947", held in June 1947.

Following the success of the session, another performance, named "Your Swing Concert", was announced to take place at the London Coliseum with sponsorship from Cavendish Music Publishers. Readers of Melody Maker were invited to vote for the performers they wished to hear participate in the event, with the magazine providing a guide of "the foremost musicians in the country at the moment". Held on 25 January 1942, the event differed from the 1941 jam session in that it emphasised swing as a powerful youth phenomenon, rather than a gathering of a "rapt audience and expertly selected players".

Despite the success of the First English Public Jam Session, early attempts by its instigators to repeat the style proved impossible as the war gathered momentum. It was not until 1947, when Harry Parry (who participated in the original jam) proposed to Melody Maker and EMI that the "present-day high standard of extemporisation among our leading swing players" made a revival of the scheme beneficiary, that a true follow-up was organised. Entitled "The Melody Maker–Columbia Jazz Rally of 1947", the session occurred at EMI Recording Studios on 3 June 1947 and was notable for bringing together English and American players, the latter on loan from Columbia Records – this was, to Parry, an opportunity to prove to the American market the viability of British jazz musicians and the homegrown dance band scene. Excerpts of the session were released on record by Columbia.

== Track listing ==
The three releases are credited as "First English Public Jam Session Recording".

=== "Tea for Two" ===
Catalogue number B-9249

Side one
No.	Title	Writer(s)	Length
1.	"Tea for Two–Part 1"	Vincent Youmans

Side two
No.	Title	Writer(s)	Length
1.	"Tea for Two–Part 2"	Youmans

=== "St. Louis Blues" ===
Catalogue number B-9250

Side one
No.	Title	Writer(s)	Length
1.	"St. Louis Blues–Part 1"	W. C. Handy

Side two
No.	Title	Writer(s)	Length
1.	"St. Louis Blues–Part 2"	Handy

=== "Honeysuckle Rose" / "I Found a New Baby" ===
Catalogue number C-3269

Side one
No.	Title	Writer(s)	Length
1.	"Honeysuckle Rose"	Fats Waller, Andy Razaf

Side two
No.	Title	Writer(s)	Length
1.	"I Found a New Baby"	Spencer Williams, Jack Palmer

== Personnel ==
Adapted from Jazz and Ragtime Records, 1897–1942: Volume 1 (2002) and the H.M.V. labels.

"Tea for Two"

- Carl Barriteau – clarinet, leader
- Harry Parry – trumpet
- Lad Busby – trombone
- Buddy Featherstonhaugh – tenor sax
- Dick Katz – piano
- Frank Deniz – guitar
- Tommy Bromley – bass
- George Fierstone – drums

"St. Louis Blues"

- Frank Weir – clarinet, leader
- Billy Munn – piano
- Jean Sasson – guitar
- Maurice Burman – drums
- Leslie "Jiver" Hutchinson – trumpet
- Woolf Phillips – trombone
- Len Newberry – tenor sax
- Jaap Sajet – bass

"Honeysuckle Rose" and "I Found a New Baby"

- Harry Parry – clarinet, leader
- Dave Wilkins – trumpet
- Woolf Phillips – trombone
- Bobby Midgley – drums
- Art Thompson – piano
- Aubrey Franks – tenor sax
- Joe Deniz – guitar
- Charlie Short – bass

== See also ==
- A Jam Session at Victor – 1937 American jazz quintet single
