= A Jam Session at Victor =

1937 American jazz quintet single

Single by Tommy Dorsey, Bunny Berigan, Thomas "Fats" Waller, Dick McDonough and George "Georgia" Wettling
- A-side: "Honeysuckle Rose"
- B-side: "Blues"
- Released: April 1937
- Recorded: March 31, 1937
- Studio: Victor studios, New York City
- Genre: Dixieland; swing
- Length: 6:09
- Label: Victor; HMV

A Jam Session at Victor is a recording of an authentic jam session between five American jazz musicians—pianist Fats Waller, trombonist Tommy Dorsey, trumpeter Bunny Berigan, guitarist Dick McDonough and drummer George Wettling—released in the United States by Victor Records as a 78rpm 10" record in 1937. In the United Kingdom and Australia, the record was released by His Master's Voice.

The session, which took place on March 31, 1937, at Victor's New York City studios, was quickly arranged by the label's recording director Eli Oberstein when he noticed that all five musicians were in the city at once for separate reasons. It was more impromptu than the assembled pickup group had envisioned, as Oberstein neglected to choose music for the group play, so they elected on the jam standards "Honeysuckle Rose" and "Blues" as the basis for their energetic improvised performances in the Dixieland and swing idioms. The musicians did not rehearse for the jam and also forewent a written score.

Released during the rising popularity of jazz and jam sessions, A Jam Session at Victor reached number four on the pop charts and contemporary reviews acknowledged the extempore playing. The session has been described as a historic recording and collector's item, being archived by the National Museum of American History, and its tracks have been reissued multiple times. Retrospective commentators have focused on the playing of the individuals, with some considering the jam session among the best recorded work of several of its contributors.

== Background and recording ==
As jazz pianist Fats Waller returned to his native New York City in March 1937 to play at the Apollo Theater, thus concluding his latest tour, Eli Oberstein, recording director at Waller's label Victor, noticed that several of the label's other jazz artists were in New York at that moment, namely Tommy Dorsey, Bunny Berigan, Dick McDonough and George Wettling. Deciding to take advantage of the coincidence, Oberstein arranged an authentic jam session for the musicians, with the results to be released on a Victor record. Numerous phone calls were necessary to bring the musicians together. Drummer George Watling later said that Berrigan and Dorsey were on bad terms with each other, their shared animosity intense enough for the other musicians to initially believe neither would turn up for the session. To this end, Oberstein convinced the participants that the jam session would be musically and financially beneficiary to each of them. According to critic Gilbert M. Erskine, the five musicians were enthused with the idea of playing authentic jazz on a record scheduled for commercial release.

The five musicians gathered for the jam at the Victor studio on March 31, 1937, where they discovered that the session was going to be considerably more impromptu than they had envisioned. This was because Oberstein neglected to choose any music for them to play, having focused so much time on phoning the musicians to secure their participation. The assembled musicians—who became a pickup group for the occasion—only agreed on "Honeysuckle Rose" and "Blues" to play after they had all arrived. The session featured Waller on piano, Berigan on trumpet, McDonough on guitar, Dorsey on trombone and Wettling on drums. It was reported that the musicians were locked in the studio with several bottles of gin and "left to their own devices" for the session. Wettling said that the interplay between the players was so strong that they were reluctant for the session to end, but after it did, "we all took off on our separate ways. Just like that."

The Berigan biographer Robert Dupuis has an alternate account of the jam session's origin, writing that Waller, McDonough, Berigan, Dorsley and Wettling were all in different Victor studios recording different sessions, before they decided to come together and jam as a means to kill time. Accordingly, Oberstein—there as an engineer—suggested to the musicians that he record their jamming. Some have suggested that the idea for A Jam Session at Victor originated in part when Waller and Berigan were paired together on an episode of the WABC and CBS network radio series Saturday Night Swing Club, broadcast live from New York City on January 16, 1937. Dorsey and McDonough were also guests on the show at other points.

== Composition ==
=== Musical style and selections ===
A Jam Session at Victor is in the style of hot jazz (Dixieland), or swing, and was completely unrehearsed. As Brian Rust explained in his discussion of A Jam Session at Victor, contemporary jam sessions like that captured on the record were intended to gather straight dance musicians "who could and wished to play 'hot' for the sole purpose of doing just that – without rehearsal or written scores, just a few mutually ideas on routine; so many bars ensemble, so many bars trumpet, middle eight by clarinet, modulation to a different key for whole trombone chorus, and so on." With this sketchy routine agreed on, the musicians would improvise on their own, resulting in energetic, danceable music where the musicians' respects for each other's talents would help avert "musical mayhem."

At the time, jam sessions were growing in popularity, reflecting public interest in the informal activities of jazz instrumentalists. This popularity helped solidify a canon of 'standards' as the basis for improvised performances, with "Honeysuckle Rose" established as a key part of the repertoire. It had been included among other nascent standards, such as "Tiger Rag" and "Basin Street Blues", in the March 1936 WNEW radio broadcast A Demonstration of Swing, which featured Berigan. Waller, as the author of the composition, had already recorded it numerous times, and played it on radio, in film, transcription discs, home recordings and on stage; two other recordings, credited to his sextet Fats Waller and His Rhythm, were recorded on November 7, 1934, and April 9, 1937. The author Catherine Tackley states that while it was natural to Waller to play one of his own pieces in the jam session, the specific decision to play "Honeysuckle Rose" suggested that the composition had become "standard fare for up-tempo jamming, just as the blues was established as the basis for slower impromptu performances."

=== Structure ===
Beginning at medium tempo, "Honeysuckle Rose" is bookended by arpeggios and features lead playing from Berigan, supported by Dorsey's Dixieland fill parts, before the latter takes the next chorus for a series of riffs supported by McDonough. The author Richard Lieberson writes that McDonough begins his chorus with a chordal paraphrase of the main melody, succeeded by a chordal figure high on the fretboard and then intricate triplet double-stop work that demonstrates the musician's right-hand technique. On the second "A" section, McDonough plays with the melody an octave lower before exploring bent double-stops on the top strings. On the stop-time bridge, Wettling performs a drum solo, before McDonough creates rhythmic tension with a series of dotted quarter notes against the 4/4 time rhythm, setting up what Lieberson calls "a three-against-four feel."

"Blues" is in E-flat and concert pitch. Dorsey plays the opening four bars of his chorus in stop-time, such that it resembles an intro rather than a chorus element, while floating lines of guitar in support of Dorsey evoke the elegiac mood of Louis Armstrong's "Knockin' a Jug" (1929), according to Erskine. The rhythm abruptly switches to a solid 4/4 time for Berigan's chorus, which is tightly phrased in a distinctive hot jazz manner. During Waller's chorus, McDonough and Wettling rework the press roll drumming that Kaiser Marshall performs on "Knockin' a Jug" so that it effectively becomes "a joint guitar trem[o]lo–drum press–roll backing for Waller." During McDonough's reflective chorus, the beat is implied—rather than stated—as Berigan and Dorsey use eighth note figures, with the piano veering into a countermelody "without left hand rhythm", while triplet figures are heard on trumpet. The horns jam in ensemble for the closing chorus, while Berigan performs extended, lazy blue notes derived from Armstrong's "Muggles" (1929). Dorsey's playing at the end of the track was described by Levin as "the dangdest circus tone you’ve ever heard."

== Release and reception ==
By the recording of A Jam Session at Victor, jazz had become a fashionable vogue in the media, attracting attention in publications like The New Yorker, Esquire, Variety, American Music Lover and The New York Sun; amid this, the record has been posited by Erskine in The Second Line as well-timed. The jam session was intended as a promotional exercise for the Victor label. In the United States, Victor issued it in 1937 as a 78rpm 10" record priced at 50 cent with the catalogue number 25559, following on from Jam Session by Benny Goodman's Orchestra, which received the catalogue number 25497. The release reached number four on the pop charts. In the United Kingdom and Australia, His Master's Voice (HMV) released the record with the catalogue number B8580. On May 26, 1942, "Honeysuckle Rose" was played on the twelfth episode of Jazz in America, a radio series created by the U.S. Office of War Information for overseas broadcast, with "Blues" broadcast on the fourteenth episode two days later; both episodes were dedicated to Waller's music.

In Australia, contemporary reviewer Ron Wills of Wireless Weekly described it as "a record of an authentic jam session arranged by five of the finest dance musicians in the world of today." Noting that the record allowed readers a chance to hear jamming, having only read about it in previous issues, Wills praised "Blues" as "magnificent" and felt that those familiar with Waller solely for his hoarse voice and "blatantly commercial piano work" would not recognise his "beautiful work on piano here", concluding that the record is "a must have for all swing worshipppers". Among UK publications, Radio Pictorial critic Edgar Jackson made it his 'record of the week' for swing fans, whereas Popular Wireless compared it to earlier attempts at "so-called extempore playings" made by the BBC and told the musicians: "Go to it, lads, and have a good exciting eighteenpence-worth!" Practical Wireless named it a novelty record of "extempore playing" in swing style. Five years later, Down Beat's Mike Levin recommended it for those looking to buy their first hot jazz record. He praised the third chorus on "Honeysuckle Rose" as "some of the biggest toned guitar on wax with splendid ideas", saying it would change the minds of those who believe "the Chris Christians' biting single note attack is the only way to play jazz guitar should listen to this." He also praised Biergman's chorus on "Blues" for representing why hot jazz is "a pleasure to listen to", though conceded Waller's parts are "a little too dainty and with too many runs."

== Legacy ==
=== Availability ===
Dupuis describes A Jam Session at Victor as a "historic recording session", with both performances "prized by collectors". In 1958, Hi Fi & Music Review included it in a list of collectible 78s demonstrating the multiple facets of hot jazz. The two tracks on A Jam Session at Victor have been reissued many times. In 1967, the A Jam Session at Victor recording of "Blues" was offered on a bonus disc, entitled Jam Session, to those buying all six volumes of The Glenn Miller Years through Reader's Digest in the UK. In 1972, both tracks featured on the RCA Vintage compilation Swing, Volume One, containing early swing band recordings. Both of these compilations credited the artist as "A Jam Session at Victor". Both tracks also featured on the 1981 Fats Weller compilation Giants of Jazz, released through Time-Life, and Waller's 2008 compilation Complete Recorded Works, Vol. 4: New York Chicago Hollywood. In 1997, "Honeysuckle Rose" featured on the box set RCA Victor 80th Anniversary: Collector's Edition. A Jam Session at Victor is archived in the National Museum of American History.

=== Critical reassessment ===
Retrospectively, Jack Sohmer of DownBeat highlighted A Jam Session at Victor for being "long heralded" and stressed its rhythmic quality. He believed both tracks feature "some of the greatest Bunny Berigan ever recorded", as well as arguably Dorsey's best jazz work on record, but lamented that Benny Goodman and Bud Freeman were absent from "what could have been an ideally constituted jam ensemble". In 1942, Down Beat included A Jam Session at Victor in their selected discography of Berigman's best tunes and solos. Wettling received praise for the record in the pages of Down Beat in 1943, at a time when he wrote for the magazine. In 1968, Down Beat listed "Honeysuckle Rose" from A Jam Session at Victor as one of the best of Wettling's "many fine records". Cadence magazine described both tracks as "excellent and joyful" and praised Berigan's solo on "Honeysuckle Rose" as "classic".

Among music authors, Scott Yanow comments that the two recordings on A Jam Session at Victor are the best recordings of McDonough's own playing, alongside four guitar duets made with Carl Kress from 1934 to 1937, noting that McDonough otherwise took surprisingly few solos on his studio recordings. Lieberson, writing in The Guitar in Jazz: An Anthology (1996), similarly opines that A Jam Session at Victor contains some of McDonough's finest and best-known playing. Maurice Waller and Anthony Calabrese, in their biography of Waller, opined that Berrigan and Dorsey share some "amazing musical exchanges" on A Jam Session at Victor, despite their personal dislike of each other. The two biographers also lamented that Victor never again took advantage of the opportunity to "gather such jazz greats together for another jam", believing this to seem strange in hindsight.

Gilbert M. Erskine of The Second Line considers "Blues" to be "a classic blues instrumental" comparable to Armstrong's "Knockin' a Jug". He invoked a concept found in systems of artistic theory, namely "the concept of an idea perceived and lying dormant in the unconscious intellect, where it is refined, reworked, before finding ultimate expression", to praise the "stunningly effective" tremolo–press roll work of McDonough and Wettling during Waller's chorus, further praising the "absolutely superb" effect of implied rhythm later in the track. Berigan and Dosey continued a professional relationship, although their mutual respect was usually only musical rather than also personal. Oscar Moore borrowed from McDonough's final solo on "Honeysuckle Rose" for one of Nat "King" Cole's recordings of the composition, whereas George Barnes remembered it almost note-for-note even after a gap of 35 years.

== Track listing ==
Side one
No.	Title	Writer(s)	Length
1.	"Honeysuckle Rose"	Fats Waller	3:09

Side two
No.	Title	Writer(s)	Length
1.	"Blues"	Waller	3:00

== Personnel ==
Adapted from RCA Victor 1948 Record Catalog: Classical and Popular.

- Tommy Dorsey – trombone
- Bunny Berigan – trumpet
- Thomas "Fats" Waller – piano
- Dick McDonough – guitar
- George "Georgia" Wettling – drums

== See also ==
- First English Public Jam Session
- Jazz at the Philharmonic
- Jam band
