= Max Abrams =

Scottish-born dance band drummer and teacher

- Born: Max Abramovitch; August 11, 1907; Glasgow, Scotland
- Died: November 5, 1995 (aged 88)
- Occupations: Jazz drummer; dance band musician; drum teacher
- Known for: Influential drum educator; member of major British dance bands

Max Abrams (original name Max Abramovitch, 11 August 1907 – 5 November 1995), was a British dance band and jazz drummer and an influential teacher of several generations of drummers.

== Early career ==
Born in Glasgow, Abrams was largely self-taught in music, playing with the Boys Brigade from the age of 14, and a year later winning the Glasgow Battalion Drumming Championship. He toured with Archie Pitt's Busby Boy's Band – a junior pit orchestra and revue band that often starred Gracie Fields, and which also gave Nat Gonella his professional start as a musician – and performed at local venues such as the Glasgow Locarno dance hall, which opened on Sauchiehall Street in 1926. He played there in 1928 with bands such as Chalmers Wood (brother of George Scott-Wood) and his Scottish Dance Orchestra.

== Soho jazz clubs and hotel ballrooms ==
In 1930 Abrams toured South Africa with the saxophonist Vic Davis. Back in London in the early 1930s he was a regular player at the jazz clubs of Soho, such as Ciro's Club and in the house band at the Gargoyle Club. For Jim Godbolt Abrams was a classic "Archer Street man" from the dance band school, playing for a living and not interested in the purist conventions of jazz music. During this period he played with (among others) Joe Gibson, Tommy Kinsman (sax), Teddy Sinclair and (from March 1932 to October 1934) Jack Hylton. This led to longer-term engagements with the band leaders Sydney Lipton (at Grosvenor House) and (between 1935 and 1939) Carroll Gibbons and the Savoy Orpheans, and later Geraldo at the Savoy Hotel. He also formed his own bands for recording in the late 1930s.

== Wartime and post-war performances ==
During the war Abrams served as a Sub Lieutenant in the Royal Navy Volunteer Reserve, coaching cadet bands. In the 1940s he toured with Sid Phillips, George Scott-Wood, Jack Payne and briefly with Stéphane Grappelli and with Humphrey Lyttleton. With James Moody (piano) and Bert Weedon (guitar) he was a regular broadcaster on the touring BBC radio programme Workers' Playtime between 1954 until 1958.

== Tuition ==
From the 1940s Abrams established himself as an influential and respected drum teacher, first at Trinity College of Music and then at his own drum school in London, where over the years he taught "countless professional drummers". These included the classical percussionist James Holland, jazz drummers such as Paul Burwell, Eric Delaney, Bill Eyden, Jack Parnell and Ed Thigpen, and then a later generation of rock drummers such as Brian Bennett, Stewart Copeland, Carl Palmer, Simon Phillips, Tony Meehan and studio session musician Neal Wilkinson. He also taught the guitar amplification pioneer Jim Marshall and several celebrity variety artists, including Norman Wisdom, Anthony Valentine and Roy Castle.

Abrams wrote around 50 drum and jazz tutoring books, most notably Modern Techniques for the Progressive Drummer in 1966, regarded by some as "the most comprehensive manual ever produced". He also narrated and demonstrated techniques on a set of tuition records issued by Parlophone in 1935: the poet and jazz fan Philip Larkin recalled that while a boy he persuaded his parents to buy him "an elementary drum kit and a set of tuition records by Max Abrams". He wrote a regular "Drummer's Corner"' column in Crescendo magazine during the 1960s.

== Final years ==
In the 1960s, Abrams was living at Rembrandt Close, off Holbein Place in London, SW1. He continued teaching full-time in London until 1977. His wife died in 1979 and he moved to Eastbourne - at Delamere Court in Hythe Road - taking some private pupils there until his health began to give way in 1991. He died there in 1995, aged 88. Between 1943 and 1992 he kept detailed diaries of his performance career, his pupils and personal information. The diaries and other information are held at the Leeds Conservatoire Jazz Archive.

== Selected publications ==
- Modern Techniques for the Progressive Drummer (1966)
- The Book of Django (1973, privately published)
- Drum Tonics, drum tuition records, Parlophone R 2164, 2165, 2166 (1935)
