= Dave Wilkins =

Barbadian jazz trumpeter

Dave Wilkins (September 25, 1914 – November 26, 1990) was a Barbadian jazz trumpeter.

Wilkins first played in Salvation Army bands in his native Barbados. In 1937, he moved to London, England, where he worked with Ken Snakehips Johnson's West Indian Swing Band among others. He recorded with Una Mae Carlisle and Fats Waller in 1938, and continued to work with Johnson until 1941. In 1949, he was a member of the group that played the first night of BBC Jazz Cub. Following this, he played with English jazz musicians such as Ted Heath, Harry Parry, Joe Daniels and Cab Kaye. He stopped playing in the 1970s and died in 1990.

== See also ==
- First English Public Jam Session
