= Our Man in Havana (film) =

1959 British spy comedy film based on the 1958 novel

- theatrical poster
- Directed by: Carol Reed
- Written by: Graham Greene
- Produced by: Carol Reed
- Starring: Alec Guinness; Burl Ives; Ralph Richardson; Noël Coward; Maureen O'Hara; Ernie Kovacs
- Cinematography: Oswald Morris
- Edited by: Bert Bates
- Music by: Frank Deniz; Laurence Deniz
- Production company: Kingsmead Productions
- Distributed by: Columbia Pictures
- Release dates: 30 December 1959 (UK); 27 January 1960 (USA)
- Running time: 107 minutes
- Country: United Kingdom
- Language: English
- Box office: $2,000,000 (US/ Canada)

Our Man in Havana is a 1959 British spy comedy film shot in CinemaScope, directed and produced by Carol Reed, and starring Alec Guinness, Burl Ives, Maureen O'Hara, Ralph Richardson, Noël Coward and Ernie Kovacs. The film is adapted from the 1958 novel Our Man in Havana by Graham Greene. The film takes the action of the novel and gives it a more comedic touch. The movie marks Reed's third collaboration with Greene.

== Plot ==
In pre-revolutionary Cuba, James Wormold, a vacuum cleaner salesman, is recruited by Hawthorne of the British Secret Intelligence Service to be their Havana operative. Instead of recruiting his own agents, Wormold invents agents from men he knows only by sight and sketches "plans" for a rocket-launching pad based on vacuum cleaner parts to increase his value to the service and to procure more money for himself and his extravagant daughter Milly.

Because his importance grows, he is sent a secretary, Beatrice, and a radioman from London to be under his command. With their arrival, it becomes much harder for Wormold to maintain his facade. However, all of his invented information begins to come true: his cables home are intercepted and believed to be true by enemy agents who then act against his "cell". One of his "agents" is killed, and he is targeted for assassination. He admits what he has done to his secretary, and he is recalled to London. At the film's conclusion, rather than telling the truth to the Prime Minister and other military intelligence services, Wormold's commanders (led by Ralph Richardson) agree to fabricate a story claiming his imagined machines had been dismantled. They bestow an OBE on Wormold and offer him a position teaching espionage classes in London.

== Cast ==
- Alec Guinness as Jim Wormold
- Burl Ives as Dr Hasselbacher
- Maureen O'Hara as Beatrice Severn
- Ernie Kovacs as Captain Segura
- Noël Coward as Hawthorne
- Ralph Richardson as 'C'
- Jo Morrow as Milly Wormold
- Grégoire Aslan as Cifuentes
- Paul Rogers as Hubert Carter
- Raymond Huntley as General
- Ferdy Mayne as Professor Sanchez
- Maurice Denham as Admiral
- Joseph P. Mawra as Lopez
- Duncan Macrae as MacDougal
- Gerik Schjelderup as Svenson
- Hugh Manning as Officer
- Karel Stepanek as Dr Braun
- Maxine Audley as Teresa
- Timothy Bateson as Rudy
- John Le Mesurier as Louis the Waiter

== Production ==
Alfred Hitchcock tried to get the film rights to the novel but felt they were too expensive. A deal was done with Carol Reed, who had already made two successful films based on Graham Greene's literary works (notably The Third Man in 1949), and Columbia Studios, for whom Reed had just made The Key. Greene and Reed worked on the script together in Brighton and London.

Columbia wanted actors in the cast familiar to American audiences, which led to the casting of such names as Maureen O'Hara, Burl Ives, and Ernie Kovacs, and making the daughter character American. Reed wanted the daughter played by Jean Seberg but she had signed to make Breathless. Kovacs recommended Jo Morrow, who was under contract to Columbia.

Filming started on location in Havana in March 1959 just two months after the overthrow of the Batista regime. Shooting was relatively smooth, with some difficulties. Fidel Castro visited the film crew on 13 May 1959, while they shot scenes at Havana's Cathedral Square. The unit then moved to London and filmed at Shepperton Studios.

Alec Guinness wrote that Reed wanted him to play his part differently from how the actor envisioned.

I had seen, partly suggested by the name, an untidy, shambling, middle-aged man with worn shoes, who might have bits of string in his pocket, and perhaps the New Statesman under his arm, exuding an air of innocence, defeat and general inefficiency. When I explained this Carol said, ‘We don’t want any of your character acting. Play it straight. Don’t act.’ That might be okay for some wooden dish perhaps but was disastrous for me. ‘Mustn’t act, mustn’t act,’ I kept repeating to myself; and didn’t. The director, particularly a world-famous one like Carol, is always right. Or often so.

Graham Greene later said:

My books don’t in fact make good films, and when I write a novel I never think about whether it might adapt to the screen. The only book written with the screen in mind, It’s a Battlefield, was never made into a film. The only good films, The Third Man and The Fallen Idol, are those which I wrote as screenplays. The rest were nearly all made in America and were, with one exception, deplorable. As for Our Man in Havana and Brighton Rock, this may sound pretentious, but all that saved them was the fact that I took a close hand in their production.

== Reception ==
=== Critical ===
Our Man in Havana was positively received by film critics; it has a "fresh" rating of 95% (with 20 reviews) at the review aggregator website Rotten Tomatoes. However according to Guinness:

When the film was released we both received a well-deserved poor press. On the morning the critics flayed us Carol invited me round to his Chelsea home for a drink. We stood side by side rather despondently, looking out of a window at small children scampering in the Kings Road. ‘At least they can’t read,’ Carol said. We shrugged the whole thing off. The only person I felt sorry for was Graham, who had been lucky with Carol in the past but was to continue to be unlucky with me.

Sight and Sound magazine later said:

Sir Carol Reed, resuming his partnership with Greene after several years, has been given a subject more or less hand-made for him. He could scarcely go wrong; but it is a little sad, when one looks back to the evenly matched teamwork of The Third Man, to note that the writer now seems more agile than the director. Greene’s novel scored as cleanly as a knock-out. Sir Carol’s film wins on points, but it is sometimes a near thing; and it is the director’s footwork, his ability to manoeuvre his way through all the shifting moods of the story, which seems to have slowed up with the years.

Graham Greene blamed the performance of Jo Morrow for wrecking the film.

=== Awards ===
The film was nominated for the Golden Globe best picture (comedy or musical) award and Reed was nominated for best director by the Directors Guild of America; both lost to The Apartment.

=== Box office ===
Kine Weekly called it a "money maker" at the British box office in 1960 although it "fell short of the high hopes of an Alec Guinness-Noel Coward picture."

== Notes ==
- Wapshott, Nicholas (1994). Carol Reed : a biography. Knopf.
