= Carl Barriteau =

Jazz clarinetist (1914–1998)

Barriteau with his clarinet, c. 1955

Carl Alrich Stanley Barriteau (7 February 1914 – 24 August 1998) was a jazz clarinetist.

Born in Trinidad, Barriteau was raised in Maracaibo, Venezuela. He played tenor horn in Trinidad from 1926 to 1932, then played clarinet in a local police band from 1933 to 1936. At the same time, he also played in Port of Spain with the Jazz Hounds and the Williams Brothers Blue Rhythm Orchestra. He moved to London, where he played in Ken Johnson's West Indian Swing Band. Melody Maker named him "best clarinetist" for seven consecutive years. He led his own group on recordings for Decca Records in the 1940s.

Barriteau undertook USO tours for American troops from 1958 to 1966. He emigrated to Australia in 1970, where he died, aged 84, in Sydney.

== See also ==
- First English Public Jam Session
