= LeRoy Sanitarium =

Defunct New York hospital

The LeRoy Sanitarium, later called the LeRoy Hospital, was a medical facility in Lenox Hill, New York. It was founded in 1928 by Alice Fuller LeRoy and closed in 1980.

== Notable patients ==
- actress Marguerite Clark entered as a patient and then died there in 1940.
- actress Laura Hope Crews died there in 1942 following treatment for liver problems.
- actor Peter Fonda was born there in 1940.
- actress Doris Keane died there of cancer in 1945.
- heiress Barbara Hutton was a patient during her separation from Igor Troubetzkoy in the spring of 1951.
- journalist Dorothy Kilgallen had her final birth there in 1954. The baby was named Kerry Kollmar after the father, Richard Kollmar.
- jazz musician Dick McDonough died there in 1938.
- businesswoman Christina Onassis was born there in 1950.
- actress Dixie Carter's daughters, Ginna and Mary Dixie, were born there.
- jazz musician George Barnes recovered from a heart attack there in 1974.
