= Clare Deniz =

British jazz pianist

- Born: Clara Ethel Wason; 30 September 1911; Cardiff, Wales
- Died: 7 December 2002 (aged 91) Whitford, Hertfordshire, England
- Genres: Jazz
- Occupation: Musician
- Instrument: Piano

Clara Ethel Deniz (30 September 1911 – 7 December 2002) was a British jazz pianist who played with pioneering black British bands in London.

== Early life ==
Born in Cardiff, Wales, she was the daughter of Frederick Wason, a merchant seaman from Barbados, and Louise Bessie Wason, née Bryant, from Somerset in south-west England.

== Career ==
She earned her first resident post thanks to the help of the Trinidadian drummer Happy Blake, at his Rendezvous des Artistes, and it was there that she met musicians from Ken "Snakehips" Johnson's new band, made up solely of black musicians, and with which her brother-in-law was the guitarist. After the then-pianist Yorke de Souza moved to Australia, she took over in Mayfair's Florida Club, and remained there until her first child was born.

Her husband had to serve abroad during the war, and she worked with musicians including the bandleader Eric Winstone as well as the trumpeters Johnny Claes and Leslie Hutchinson. She later joined the West Indian Swing Stars, with Bertie King on saxophone, Coleridge Goode on bass, and Lauderic Caton on guitar. She later worked with Frank's Spirits of Rhythm, with Jimmy Skidmore on tenor saxophone.

She worked until the 1980s, when they moved to Málaga, Spain.

== Personal life ==
On 8 August 1936 she married Frank Deniz, guitarist and bandleader, at the church of St Mary the Virgin Church, Caerau, Cardiff. They had two daughters, Lorraine and Claire.

== Later life ==
In the 1980s, they moved to Málaga, but returned to the UK in the 1990s when she was in the early stages of Parkinson's disease. She died at the age of 91 on 7 December 2002, in Whitford, Hertfordshire.
