= George Evans (bandleader) =

English jazz bandleader, arranger, and musician (1915–1993)

George Evans (7 August 1915 – 16 February 1993) was an English jazz bandleader, arranger, tenor saxophonist and vocalist.

== Early life and career ==
Evans was born in north London on 7 August 1915. Having started playing ukulele-banjo in a group led by Norrie Paramor, he moved on to the saxophone at 14, and was doing local gigs at age 15. He got his first professional job in Sonny Winter's Band in Southend at 16, before going on to join Al Lever's band.

In the early 1930s, he was playing tenor saxophone and doing arrangements for Freddie Bretherton's band. When Bretherton joined Syd Lipton's band in 1935, Evans went with him, and wrote scores, played saxophone and sang in Lipton's band. In 1938, together with fellow saxophonist Harry Hayes he joined Geraldo and between 1938 and 1942 was arranging, singing and playing tenor for the orchestra. Evans was the composer of Geraldo's signature tune "Hello Again".

From 1940 to 1946, Evans was a member of the Welsh Guards Band, although, like many servicemen at the time, he carried on playing with civilian bands, as well as appearing on broadcasts with George Melachrino's combined Forces Orchestra. Evans also ran his own band, Saxes 'n Sevens, at the Embassy Club, made up of three altos, four tenors, and four musicians in the rhythm section, including leading saxophonists of the day: Hayes, Les Gilbert and Tommy Bradbury, on altos; himself, Jimmy Durrant, Poggy Pogson, Tommy Bradbury, Andy McDevitt, Norman Maloney, and Aubrey Frank on tenors. Later lineups would also include Pete King. The rhythm section consisted of, at various times, Joe Deniz on guitar, Wilkie Davidson on bass, Bobby Midgeley or Kenny Clare on drums and George Shearing or Ronnie Selby on piano. During the War, Evans also played, sang, and did arrangements for with the George Melachrino combined Forces Orchestra, and broadcast with them. Evans also recorded for Decca Records with a band comprising five trumpets, ten saxes, and four rhythm. The recordings were credited to the George Evans Orchestra directed by Leslie Evans, his brother.

George left the Welsh Guards in 1946, and formed a new band with ten saxes and five trumpets. After a residency at the Hammersmith Palais, he was admitted to a sanatorium with tuberculosis and his brother Les took the band on tour until February 1947. Following lengthy hospital treatment and recuperation, George returned to singing with Geraldo, wrote arrangements for various bands, and formed a student orchestra. In 1949, Evans formed a new band, with four trumpets, four trombones, six saxes and four rhythm. They toured widely until 1951, when he secured a residency at the Oxford Galleries, Newcastle upon Tyne. He remained in charge of the orchestra there until 1957, during which time the size of the band expanded. Although Evans retired from leading his band in 1957, the following year he made some recordings at Alexandra Palace.

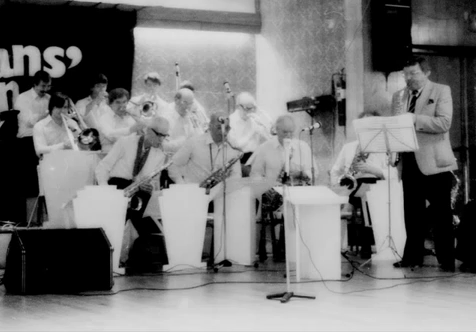
George with the Arthur Mowatt Band - seated far left, tenor sax in 1984

Other leading UK musicians who at one time were members of Evans' bands include Jimmy Staples, Don Rendell, Charles Chapman, Gracie Cole, Tony Symes, Jackie Sprague, Bill Geldard, Jock Cummings, Jack Parnell, Pat Dodd, Jack Llewellyn, Kenny Baker, Billy Riddick, Cliff Haines, Izzy Duman, Bill Apps, Eric Jupp, Malcolm Mitchell, Don Raine, Dougie Cooper, Arthur Greenslade, Ricky Derges, Ted Hunt, Bill Jackson, Graham Smith, Frank Pritchard, Hank Shaw, Arthur Mowatt, Ray Chester, Don Fairly, Eddy Shearer, Ray Harley, Gordon Marshall, David Barnes, and Denis Shirley, Charlie Payne, Frank Rogers, Roy Ringrose, Freddie Syer, Ronnie Chandler, Erik Maxwell, Dennis Hughes, Syd Dowel, Kenny Kaye, Ronnie Summerell (tenor sax), Jimmy Paul and Shirley Gray on vocals.

== Later life ==
Evans retired completely from playing music until 1980, when he returned to playing with local Newcastle bands and school youth orchestras. During this time George founded "The George Evans Young Peoples Swing Band" who rehearsed every Sunday morning at the Peoples' Theatre in Newcastle. The band rehearsed popular swing tunes like "Night and Day", "Blue Moon" and "The Grasshopper's Dance". The arrangements were meticulous in detail and voicing and quickly became popular with the band. He also played regularly on a Friday evening with the Arthur Mowatt band at the Corner House.

In 1985, to celebrate his 70th birthday, he formed a big band of local professionals and teachers to perform for one night at the Mayfair Ballroom in Newcastle.
