= Second line (parades) =

New Orleans brass band tradition

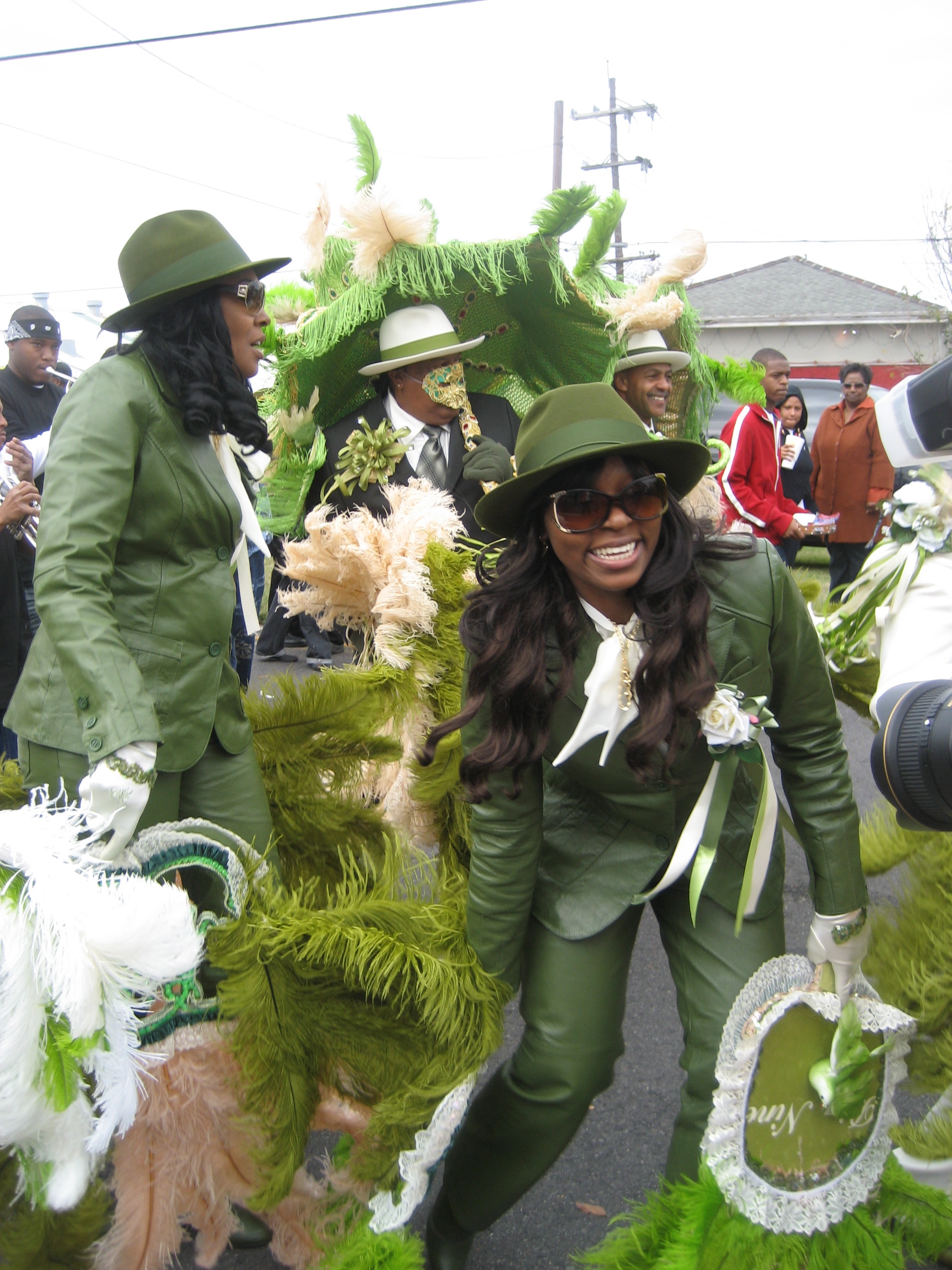
Members of Social Aid & Pleasure Clubs sponsor second line parades where they turn out in their finery.

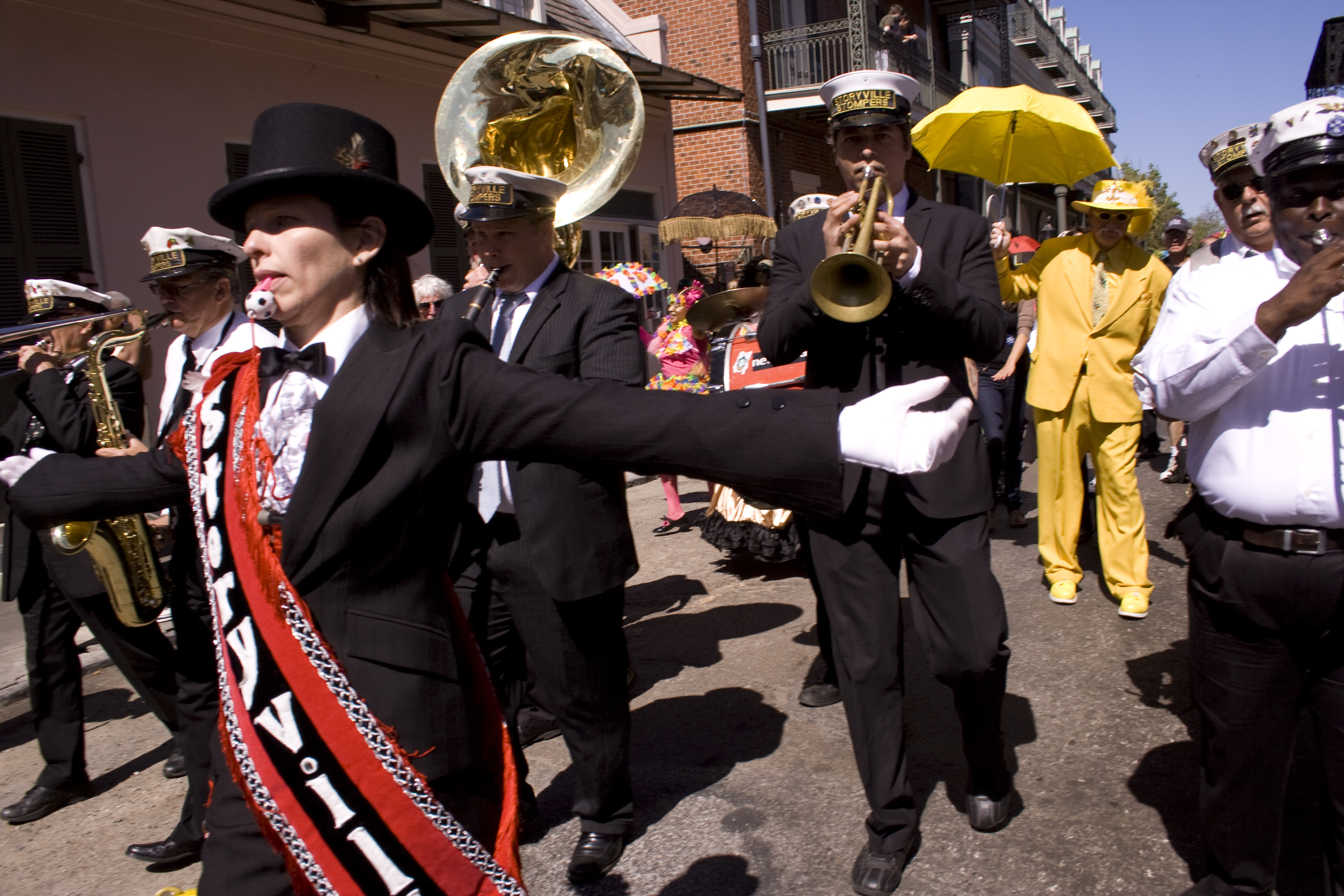
Local jazz singer Jane Harvey Brown leads the way as grand marshal for a brass band at a second line in the French Quarter in New Orleans.

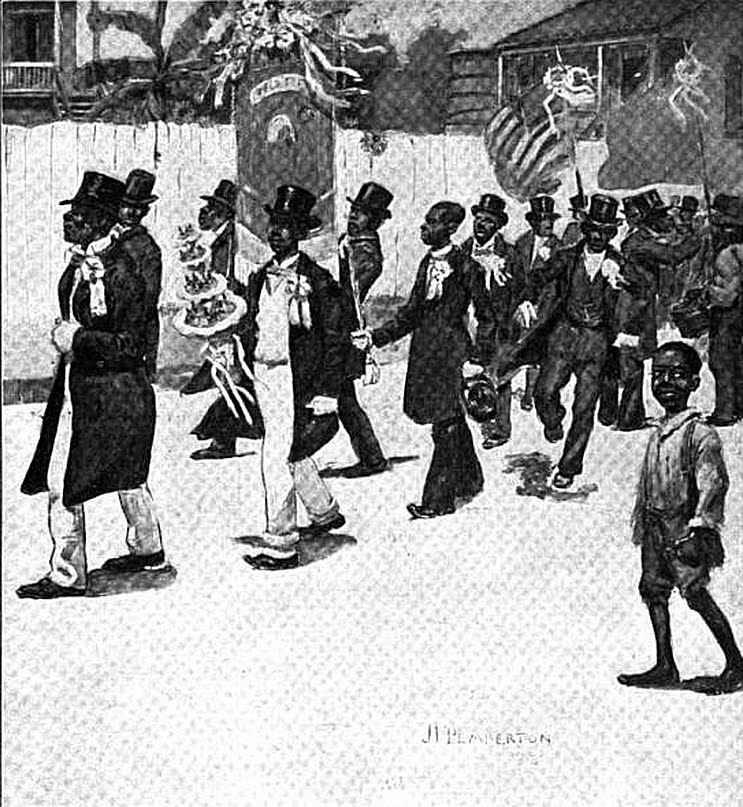
"Sons of Hope and the Annual Parade of the Young Veterans", New Orleans c. 1902

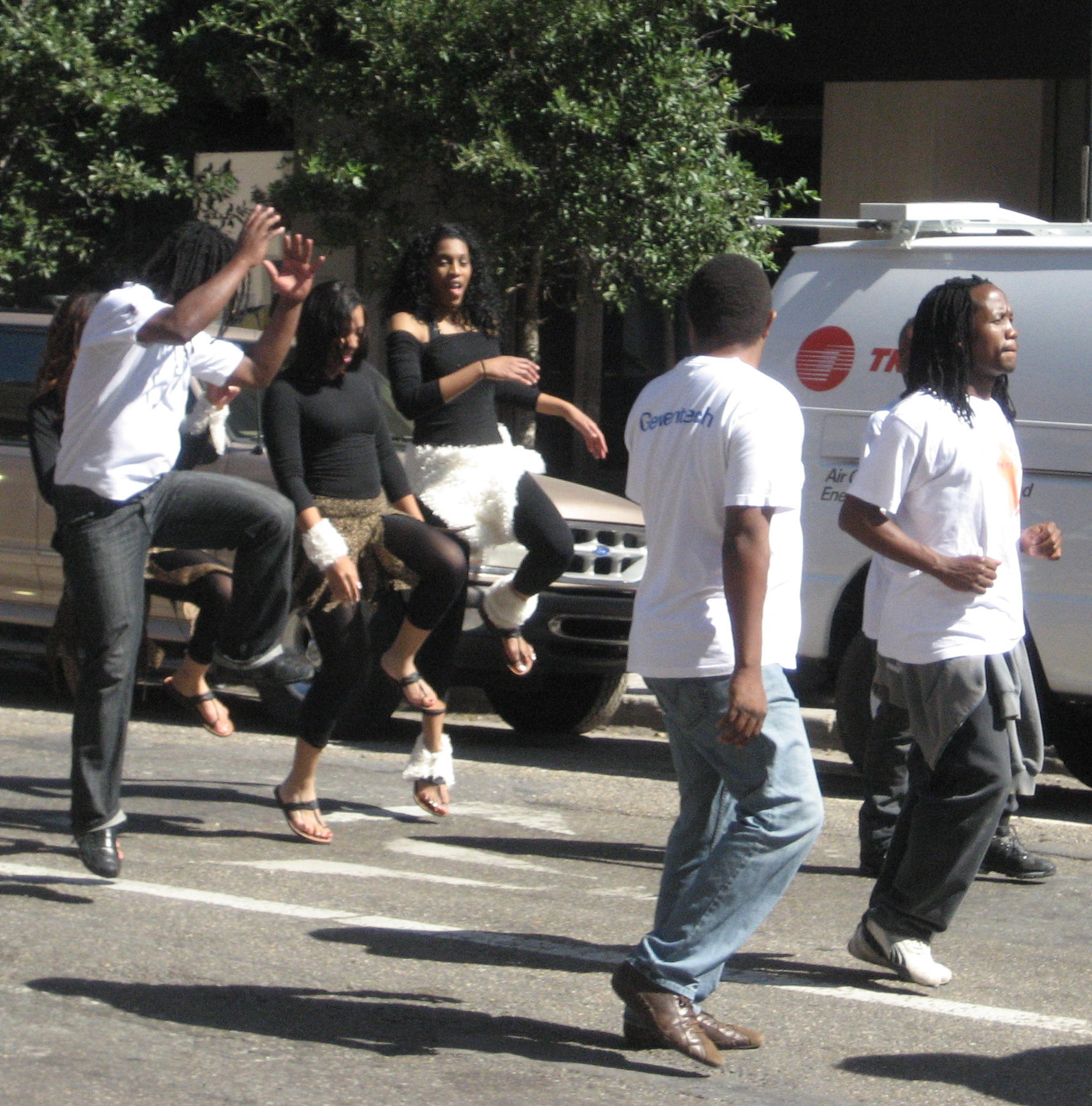
Exuberant dancing in the streets and sidewalks is part of the second line experience.

The second line is a tradition in parades organized by Social Aid and Pleasure Clubs (SAPCs) with brass band parades in New Orleans, Louisiana, United States. The "main line" or "first line" is the main section of the parade, or the members of the SAPC with the parading permit as well as the brass band. The second line consists of people who follow the band to enjoy the music, dance, and engage in community. The second line's style of traditional dance, in which participants dance and walk along with the SAPCs in a free-form style with parasols and handkerchiefs, is called "second-lining". It is one of the most foundationally Black American–retentive cultures in the United States. It has been called "the quintessential New Orleans art form – a jazz funeral without a body". Another significant difference from jazz funerals is that second line parades lack the slow hymns and dirges played at funerals (although some organizations may have the band play a solemn selection toward the start of the parade in memory of members who died since their last parade).

== Origins ==
The second line has its origins in traditional West African circle or ring dances. The second line tradition was brought to New Orleans by enslaved Africans, where it became a ritual for African Americans, especially in various processions, including funerals. Some scholars believe that the West African ring featured children drumming with adults dancing that in turn, forced the ring to straighten into a line. Others note the similarity of the steps – exaggerated, stylistic strutting – to dances performed in Congo Square by the enslaved given the day off on Sundays. These dances were officially banned for a time because they were deemed threatening to the white inhabitants of the city, and their resurgence in the second line culture suggests a similar celebration of individual freedom. The second line tradition is a blending of African ritual dancing with European-styled military bands.

The movement of street dancers in the second line gathered force in the late 19th century as it joined the linear procession of military bands, rooted in French and Spanish colonial traditions. By the time jazz flowered, the funerals showed the coming together of the ring and the line, the African ancestral circle dancing and the linear progression of the brass bands’ marching music.

An article from New Orleans states that the history of second line traditions in New Orleans' Black neighborhoods began during the era of enslavement. Enslaved and free Black people began second lines as neighborhood celebrations. "The neighborhood organizations offered social aid to freed slaves, such as loans and insurance, and used the second-lines as a form of advertising. Second lines were also used to honor members who died in their community, which launched the idea of second lines at funerals. Often, Mardi Gras Indians were and still are included in the procession."

African and African-American traditions continued throughout the "Code Noir" and Jim Crow eras in New Orleans. African-Americans formed Benevolent Societies and "Social, Aid & Pleasure Clubs" because white insurance companies often refused to cover free people of color and/or the formerly enslaved. SAPCs assisted members through illness and supported families with burial costs for deceased members. This is a carry-over from African traditions that believed in celebrating the member's spirit leaving the body to return to the ancestors and God. This led to what became known as a "jazz funeral", with the SAPC members marching in a dirge with a brass band before the deceased body being "cut loose" and a celebratory parade begins. The same club exercised their social aspect with a colorful, annual, public second line parade through their home community.

== Second line drumming ==
A second line snare drummer commonly follows the brass band, playing off the marching beat with improvised polyrhythmic figures that can inspire second line dancers or, if the band is improvising, the band itself. Second line drumming styles became a feature of early jazz drumming and the New Orleans rhythm and blues of the 1950s. The Rebirth Brass Band and the Dirty Dozen Brass Band feature traditional second line drumming styles. Drummers such as Billy Higgins and Idris Muhammad adapted second line drum figures to modern jazz.

== Modern second lining ==
Second line parades are part of the cultural heritage of New Orleans.

The locally best known second line parades are held by clubs and benevolent organizations. Some have long histories; the oldest such organization still holding regular parades is the Young Men Olympian Junior Benevolent Association, founded in 1884. During the "second line season", lasting most of the year with breaks for holidays (including Mardi Gras) and the hottest part of summer, there are second line parades most Sundays. Longer parades often make stops, commonly at bars, where refreshments have been arranged for members and those following the parade for fun can purchase something. There are often vendors selling soft drinks, beer, and street food, including barbecue and yaka mein.

Additional second lines, large or small, may be held for any event which people think merits hiring a parading band for such a style of celebration, including weddings and opening of businesses.

The historic predominantly African-American neighborhoods of Tremé and Central City are most strongly associated with the traditions, though second lines can often be seen in the Seventh Ward, Uptown, Marigny, Ninth Ward, Mid-City, and at least on occasion in most of the older neighborhoods of the city. The New Orleans Jazz & Heritage Festival holds second lines at the Fair Grounds each day of the festival to give visitors a taste of this New Orleans tradition.

A second line parade was featured in the 1973 James Bond film Live and Let Die. In 2010, the opening scene in the pilot episode, as well as the season one finale of the HBO series Tremé featured a second line parade and journalists championed second line culture. The second line culture has maintained a dedicated, organized schedule throughout the history of SAPCs in New Orleans with clubs enjoying annual parades on their selected dates with those events contributing to the local economy. The clubs never lost their African-based traditions and mores and immediately restored their scheduled parades as soon as New Orleans reopened to its citizens after the devastation of Hurricane Katrina. The Black Men of Labor held the first SAPC second line parade in October 2005. New residents of New Orleans embraced the second line tradition and parade routes were publicized online inviting outsiders to participate.

Second line parades have been taking place since the late 1800s, and with innumerable SAPC events and jazz funerals, the sheer number of events with thousands of people since that time have been lively, fun and memorable, with most taking place without incident. Violence has marred some parades in recent years, including the May 12, 2013 Mother's Day Parade shooting where 19 were wounded and one was trampled. On November 17, 2024, two people were killed and 11 others were injured in two separate shooting incidents that took place 45 minutes apart at second line parades in the St. Roch neighborhood.

=== Other places ===
This African-culture-based/New Orleans phenomenon, has been captured and presented in other parts of the country; the HONK! Festival in Somerville, Massachusetts was started by the second line Social Aid and Pleasure Society Brass Band. Asheville, North Carolina has the Asheville second line Band, which marches at parades and other local events. Oakland, California has a growing Mardi Gras celebration including parades organized by the Oakland second line Project and the Brass Boppers. In Duluth, Minnesota The Magic Smelt Puppet Troupe hosts their annual "Run, Smelt, Run!" second line parade every spring to celebrate the smelt run.

The second line – the magazine of the New Orleans jazz club, started in 1950 – took its name from the second lining tradition, which by that time included fans of jazz music, both black and white.
