= Thomas O'Regan =

Australian academic (1956–2020)

- Born: 10 May 1956; Gayndah, Queensland
- Died: 17 July 2020 (aged 64)
- Citizenship: Australian
- Education: Griffith University (B.A., 1977), (B.A. Hons 1978) (P.H.D. 1986)
- Scientific career
- Fields: Cultural studies, Media studies
- Workplaces: University of Queensland; Griffith University; Murdoch University

Thomas ("Tom") Andrew O'Regan (10 May 1956 − 17 July 2020) was a Professor of Cultural and Media Studies at the University of Queensland.

== Early years and background ==
Tom O'Regan was born in Gayndah, Queensland, Australia, in 1956. He was in the first intake of students to Griffith University in Brisbane in 1975, graduating with a BA (Hons) in 1978 and a PhD in 1986. He has taught at Murdoch University, Griffith University, and, from 2004 to the year of his death, had worked at the University of Queensland. At the time of his death, O'Regan had been an Associate Dean of Research in the Faculty of Arts from 2010 to 2020. He had also been Head of the School of English, Media Studies and Art History Ian Russell, 2005–2008, Director of the Australian Key Centre for Cultural and Media Policy (Griffith University 1999–2002) and Director of the Centre for Research in Culture and Communication (Murdoch University, 1996–1998). He was elected to the Australian Academy of the Humanities in 2002 and was, from 2002 to 2003, Australia's UNESCO-Orbicom Professor of Communication.

== Achievements ==
O'Regan was integrally involved in developing cultural policy studies, cultural studies and screen studies in Australia. He co-founded the journal Continuum: Journal of Media & Cultural Studies and was an editor from 1987–1994. His publications reflected his abiding interest in the various ways and byways of film, television and cultural sectors. Prior to his death, he was researching trajectories of film and television in Australia over the 1990s and 2000s, international film and television production, and the history of audience measurement in Australia, UK and the US.

His most notable contribution over the 2000s has been to the documentation and understanding of what has been variously called, international production, "runaway production", and "Global Hollywood". This work is marked by its attention to the places and spaces in which such production occurs including the film studio and policy infrastructures required to support it. O'Regan co-wrote with Ben Goldsmith a major report, Cinema Cities, Media Cities: the Contemporary International Studio Complex for the Australian Film Commission (2003) with this work being taken further in The Film Studio: Film Production in the Global Economy (2005). Their 2010 book, Local Hollywood: Global Film Production and the Gold Coast, co-authored with Susan Ward, used the Gold Coast in Australia to document how places outside of Los Angeles had proactively engaged with Hollywood to co-create the contemporary system of globally dispersed.

== Selected publications ==
- Local Hollywood: Global Film Production and the Gold Coast (2010) with B. Goldsmith and S. Ward.
- The Film Studio (2005) with B. Goldsmith.
- Australian National Cinema (1996)
- Australian Television Culture (1993)
- Mobilising the Audience (2002, co-edited with M. Balnaves and J. Sternberg).
- An Australian Film Reader (1985), co-edited with A. Moran.
- The Australian Screen (1989), co-edited with A. Moran.
- The Moving Image: the History of Film and Television in Western Australia 1896–1985 (1985, co-edited with B. Shoesmith).
- History onlandlin Film (1987, co-edited with B. Shoesmith).

Report co-author

- Cinema Cities/Media Cities: the Contemporary International Studio Complex(2003, with B. Goldsmith)
- The Future for Local Content: Options for Emerging Technologies (2001, with B. Goldsmith, J. Thomas and S. Cunningham).

Journal issue editor/co-editor

- 'Creative Networks' (Media International Australia, 2004).
- 'Ratings in Transition' (Media International Australia, 2002).
- 'Culture: Industry, Development, Distribution' (Media International Australia, 2002).
- 'International Issues in Media Regulation' (Media International Australia, 2000).
- 'Policy, Governance and Culture' (Critical Arts, 1998).
- 'Governmentality and its Others' (UTS Review, 1997).
- 'Critical Multiculturalism' (Continuum, 1994).
- 'Screening Cultural Studies' (Continuum, 1994).
- 'Communication and Tradition: Essays after Eric Michaels' (Continuum, 1990).
- 'Asian Cinema' (Continuum, 1988/89).
- 'Australian Film in the 1950s' (Continuum, 1987).

Report co-author

- Cinema Cities/Media Cities: the Contemporary International Studio Complex (2003, with B. Goldsmith).
- The Future for Local Content: Options for Emerging Technologies (2001, with B. Goldsmith, J. Thomas and S. Cunningham).

Refereed journal articles

- Articles and book chapters on Australian film and television, international film and television (particularly Hollywood), cultural and media policy, and new media and old media.

Journal work

- Media International Australia: Editorial Board.
- Critical Arts: Editorial advisor.
- Continuum (1987–1995): Founding co-editor.
