= George Scott-Wood =

Background information
- Born: George Scott Wood; 27 May 1903; Glasgow, Scotland
- Died: 28 October 1978 (aged 75) Eastbourne, Sussex, England
- Genres: Swing, dance band
- Occupations: Musician, bandleader, arranger, composer
- Instruments: Piano, piano accordion
- Years active: 1920s–1960s
- Labels: Parlophone, Regal Zonophone, Columbia

George Scott-Wood (27 May 1903 – 28 October 1978) was a British pianist, accordionist, arranger and bandleader.

== Biography ==
George Scott Wood (with no hyphen) was born in Glasgow, Scotland, and studied classical piano as a child. He gave public performances in his mid-teens, and won awards at classical music festivals in Glasgow and Edinburgh. In 1925, he toured in the U.S., making concert appearances. In Scotland, he also toured and recorded popular music with his brother Chalmers Wood and with a band, the Five Omega Collegians, until they disbanded in 1928. He then joined Jay Whidden's band as a pianist and arranger.

In 1930, he became director of light music for Parlophone, later extended to cover the other EMI labels, His Master's Voice, Regal Zonophone, and Columbia. He reportedly made more recordings than any other musician during the 1930s, sometimes anonymously or under a pseudonym, and in many cases arranging and leading orchestras behind such stars as Richard Tauber, Al Bowlly, Harry Lauder, Beatrice Lillie, Gracie Fields and Ivor Novello. He also recorded with the New Mayfair Dance Orchestra after its leader, Ray Noble, left for the U.S. in 1934, and established his own small jazz group, the Six Swingers, including the drummer Max Abrams. The band released over 50 recordings for the Regal Zonophone and Columbia labels in the 1930s, and in 1938 topped the Daily Mail readers' poll as radio entertainers.

Scott-Wood also established himself as a leading exponent of the piano accordion. He is credited with introducing the instrument to Britain, and in 1930 published the first comprehensive accordion tutorial book. He regularly played the accordion to accompany tango dances, and in 1934 became musical director of the London Accordion Band before forming his own Accordion Band later in the decade. Initially the band featured nine accordion players, later reduced to four with Scott-Wood on piano and others on bass, drums, guitar, and Hawaiian guitar.

Between 1943 and 1947 Scott-Wood performed mainly as a solo pianist, touring widely in Britain and visiting a wide range of military camps, theatres and factories during the Second World War and afterwards. Later, he resumed regular radio broadcasting with his Accordion Band, and regularly featured on the popular series Music While You Work, both as a bandleader and as a pianist.

He re-formed the Six Swingers in 1950, but the group could not match its former success, and he failed to persuade the Light Entertainment Department of the BBC either that he should adopt a fashionably Italian name (along the lines of Geraldo and Primo Scala), or set up a 23-piece theatre band based around his accordion band. However, in 1957 the BBC agreed that he form a seven-piece ensemble, George Scott-Wood and His Music, which included three accordions, and which continued to make regular radio appearances until the late 1960s.

Scott-Wood was a prolific composer of light music, including "Shy Serenade", "Dainty Debutante", and "Flying Scotsman".

He was married, with two children. He died in Eastbourne in 1978, at the age of 75.
