= James Holland (percussionist) =

English percussionist (1933–2022)

James Holland (12 February 1933 – January 2022) was an English orchestral and solo percussionist, principal percussionist at the BBC Symphony Orchestra from the 1970s until the 1990s.

Born in Ilford, Holland first took up percussion as an Army cadet at the age of 13. He went on to study with Peter Allen (timpanist of the London Philharmonic Orchestra), Max Abrams (drum kit) and Charles Donaldson at Trinity College of Music. After three years of National Service in the RAF Central Band he joined the London Philharmonic in 1956, and then the London Symphony Orchestra in 1959. In 1962 he succeeded his teacher Charles Donaldson as principal percussionist at the LSO. He stayed with the orchestra until 1972, when he became principal percussionist at the BBC Symphony Orchestra under the recently appointed chief conductor Pierre Boulez.

Holland was heavily involved in contemporary music. In the 1960s, with David Johnson, he was co-founder of the London Percussion Ensemble. He also played regularly with the London Sinfonietta from its foundation in 1969. He worked closely on percussion matters with many contemporary composers, including Boulez, Karlheinz Stockhausen, Benjamin Britten, Oliver Knussen, Krzysztof Penderecki and Hans Werner Henze.

From the 1960s Holland was a frequent broadcaster as a member of various contemporary chamber music groups. He taught at the Guildhall School of Music. In 1978 he published Percussion, part of the Yehudi Menuhin Music Guide Series. The Complete Book of Drum Fills was published by Drum Center Publications in July 1988. Subsequent distribution is through Hal Leonard. Practical Percussion, A Guide to Instruments and their Sources, first came out in 2003 and was revised in 2005.

From the late 1970s Holland was living in Buckinghamshire. He retired from the BBC Symphony Orchestra in 1997. He died, aged 88, in January 2022, survived by his wife Rita and his son and daughter.

== Selected recordings ==
- Shostakovich: Piano Concerto No. 2, New Philharmonia Orchestra, Warner Classics 5749912 (1965)
- Bartok: Sonata For Two Pianos And Percussion, (with Bracha Eden, Alexander Tamir and Tristan Fry), Decca SXL 6357 (1968)
- Benjamin Britten: The Prince of the Pagodas, Virgin Classics VCD 7 91103-2 (1990)
- Friedrich Cerha: Eine Art Chansons, on Songs of a Sort, Largo 7243 (1994)
- Messaien: Des Canyons aux Etoiles, London Sinfonietta, Sony Classics SB2K87951 (2004)
- Peter Dickinson: Mass of the Apocolypse, Nash Ensemble, Naxos 8.572287 (2009)
