= Victor Farris =

American inventor and businessman

Victor Farris (January 29, 1910 – March 7, 1985) was an American inventor and businessman. While some sources say he invented the paper milk carton, no patent was ever filed under his name.

== Biography ==
Victor Wallace Farris was born in Buffalo, New York. He lived in Tenafly and Englewood, New Jersey. In 1943, he founded the Farris Engineering Corporation, which became the largest valve manufacturer in the world until its merger with Teledyne in 1968.

Later, noting that glass milk bottles were so heavy, he invented and trademarked the paper milk carton. He also invented the paper clip, the Farris Safety and Relief Valve. However, a search of US patents reveals no evidence that Farris invented the paper milk carton or the paper clip. He owned seventeen companies with factories in the U.S., Canada, England, France and Australia.

In 1956, he married Celia Lipton, a British-born actress and singer, and they moved into a house that previously belonged to the Vanderbilt family in Palm Beach, Florida. They had two adopted daughters, Marian and CeCe.
