= Sydney Lipton =

British dance band leader (1906–1995)

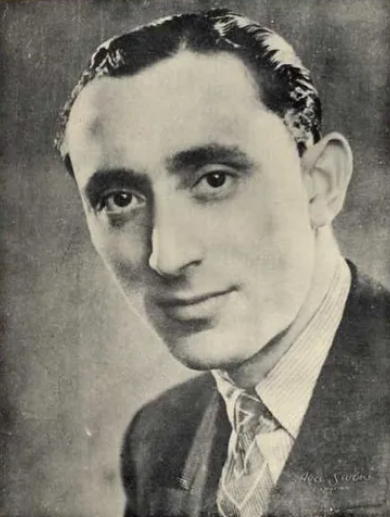
- Sydney Lipton in 1935

Background information
- Born: Simon Jacob Lipchik; 4 January 1906; London, England
- Died: 19 July 1995 (aged 89) Palm Beach, Florida, U.S.
- Occupation: Dance band leader
- Formerly of: Ted Heath, George Evans, and Billy Munn

Sydney John Lipton (born Simon Jacob Lipchik; 4 January 1906 – 19 July 1995) was a British dance band leader, popular from the 1930s to the 1960s, when it has been said that he led "one of the most polished of the British Dance Bands."

== Life and career ==
Born in Mile End, London, Lipton learned the violin as a child, and was considering finishing his studies with Albert Sammons when an injury to his hand forced a change of plan.

He turned to lighter music by joining cinema orchestras providing the accompaniment to silent movies. When living in Edinburgh in the early 1920s, he began playing in the band led by Murray Hedges, before joining the Billy Cotton Band in 1925 and making his first recordings. Lipton also recorded with Ambrose's orchestra in the mid-1920s. Lipton left Cotton to form his own dance band in 1931, and the following year became the resident bandleader at the Grosvenor House Hotel in London.

His band started recording in 1932, first for Zonophone and then Decca, and made regular appearances on BBC radio after 1933. The recordings were made between 1932 and 1941, and radio broadcasts were made at Grosvenor House where the band was in residence. Among his instrumentalists were Ted Heath, George Evans, Billy Munn, Harry Hayes, Bill McGuffie, Freddy Gardner, Max Goldberg and Max Abrams.

Lipton's daughter Celia Lipton, who later made a career as an actress and singer, joined his band as a vocalist in the 1940s. Other singers who performed with the ensemble included Anona Winn, Primrose Hayes, Les Allen, and Chips Chippindall. The band's first hit song was "I'll See You In My Dreams". Later successful tunes included "Just Dance And Leave The Music To Me" and "Sweet Harmony".

During World War II, Lipton was a member of the Royal Artillery and the Royal Signals. After serving in the forces, he returned to the Grosvenor House Hotel, and continued to lead the orchestra there until 1967. He later formed his own entertainment agency, and served as musical director for various venues and cruise ships.

He died, aged 89, in Palm Beach, Florida.
