= Billy Munn =

British jazz pianist and arranger (1911–2000)

William Munn (12 May 1911 – 2 May 2000) was a British jazz pianist and arranger.

== Early life and education ==
Munn was born on 12 May 1911 in Glasgow, Scotland. He studied at the Athenaeum School of Music, then moved to London and joined the band of Jack Hylton from 1929 to 1936.

== Career ==
Munn also played on recordings with Spike Hughes (1932) and Benny Carter (1936) during this time. Munn then played with Sydney Lipton from 1936 to 1940, and concomitantly played with Louis Armstrong and Coleman Hawkins on their tours of England, as well as with Wingy Manone in the United States. He played with Stephane Grappelli in 1943 and George Chisholm in 1944, then led his own ensemble at the Orchid Room in Mayfair from 1945 to 1948. He co-founded the BBC program Jazz Club in the 1940s with producer Mark White and clarinettist Harry Parry. He also Played With Victor Silvester becoming a member of Victor Silvester's Jive Band

From 1948 to 1949, Munn directed the Maurice Winnick Orchestra at Ciro's club in London, England, and subsequently led the house band at the Imperial Hotel in Torquay for three decades, from 1949 to 1979. He recorded several times with this group. After 1979 he played solo, mostly locally in Torquay.

== Death ==
Munn died on 2 May 2000 in Ayrshire, Scotland, 10 days shy of his 89th birthday.

== In popular culture ==
- Billy Munn's "Jazzy Interlude" was featured in the 2008 video game Fallout 3.
- Billy Munn’s “Dream Away” which was likely recorded with Victor Silvester was featured in Better Call Saul in a teaser and its farewell to the viewers.

== See also ==
- First English Public Jam Session
