= Frank Deniz =

British jazz guitarist

Francisco "Frank" Antonio Deniz (31 July 1912 – 17 July 2005) was a British jazz guitarist. He performed in London from the 1930s, and in the 1950s gave radio broadcasts. With his brothers José Deniz (1913-1994) and Laurence Deniz (1924-1996) he formed the Hermanos Deniz Cuban Rhythm Band.

== Life ==
=== Early life and career ===
Deniz was born in Cardiff in 1912. His father, Antoni Deniz, was African, born in Cape Verde; he was a seaman, and in Cardiff he married Gertrude Blanch, of English and African-American descent. They were amateur musicians, Antoni playing violin and Gertrude playing piano; on Sundays, Portuguese Africans met at their home in Butetown in Cardiff to play traditional Portuguese music, sea shanties and other music. Frank's brothers José William ("Joe") and Laurence Richard ("Laurie") also became musicians.

From the age of 15 he joined his father on sea voyages. In 1931 his father was taken ill and Deniz was forced to leave him in hospital in Odessa, where he died. Between voyages he played music, inspired by jazz guitarists Teddy Bunn and Eddie Lang.

In Cardiff he married in 1936 Clara Wason, a pianist. They moved to London, and found work as musicians in Soho; in 1937 they played for a time in the orchestra of Ken "Snakehips" Johnson. Deniz later played at Adelaide Hall's Florida Club in Mayfair, where he played with pianist Fela Sowande. Val Wilmer wrote in an obituary: "... in Soho they encountered other people of colour forced to live by their wits.... the Denizes wanted none of it, and, through musicianship and character, distanced themselves from limiting, pre-ordained roles."

=== 1940s and later ===
Deniz joined the Merchant Navy in May 1940, in between voyages playing music with contemporaries including Eric Winstone and Edmundo Ros, and forming his own band, the Spirits of Rhythm. In 1944 he was wounded when his ship was torpedoed on approaching Anzio.

Stanley Black, leader of the BBC Dance Orchestra from 1944, was beneficial to his career by employing him regularly and introducing him to others in the music business. Deniz joined Harry Parry's Radio Rhythm Club Sextet, which had a regular radio series. He formed in 1953, with his brothers, the Hermanos Deniz Cuban Rhythm Band, which gave regular broadcasts in the 1950s regularly through to the 1970s.

Deniz composed music for the film with his brother Laurence, Our Man in Havana (1959). He accompanied Hoagy Carmichael on a tour of Britain.

=== Later years ===
In later years he played with the Hermanos Deniz band at the Talk of the Town; this continued for many years until his retirement in 1980.

In retirement the Denizes lived in Spain during the summer, until Clare contracted Parkinson's disease in the 1990s, and Deniz then became her carer. Deniz died on 17 July 2005 at his home in Stanstead Abbotts, Hertfordshire; he was predeceased by his wife and his brothers. He was survived by daughters Lorraine and Claire (cellist Clare Deniz).

== See also ==
- First English Public Jam Session
