= Continuum (journal) =

- Discipline: Cultural studies, Media studies
- Language: English
- Edited by: Panizza Allmark, Timothy Laurie, Alvin K. Wong

Publication details
- History: 1988-present
- Publisher: Routledge
- Frequency: Bimonthly
- Impact factor: 0.782 (2017)

Standard abbreviations
- ISO 4: Continuum (Mount Lawley)

Indexing
- ISSN: 1030-4312 (print); 1469-3666 (web)
- LCCN: 89646587
- OCLC no.: 45107233

Links
- Journal homepage

Continuum: Journal of Media & Cultural Studies is a peer-reviewed academic journal affiliated with the Cultural Studies Association of Australasia. It was established in 1987 by Thomas O'Regan and Brian Shoesmith. It is edited by Panizza Allmark (Senior/Chief Editor), Alvin K. Wong and Timothy Laurie. The journal is published by Taylor & Francis.

== Abstracting and indexing ==
The journal is abstracted and indexed in the International Bibliography of the Social Sciences.
