= The Second Line =

The Second Line (1950–present) is the official magazine of the New Orleans Jazz Club. Formed in April 1950, the magazine is dedicated to jazz musicians, teachers, and enthusiasts who have attempted to preserve New Orleans jazz music from commercialization. Its name is a reference to the practice of the second line.

== History ==
The Second Line was the publication of the New Orleans Jazz Club, founded by four white friends in 1948, during the annual Zulu parade at Mardi Gras in New Orleans. Attracting musicians and record collectors alike, the club was dedicated to documenting and preserving jazz music from the New Orleans area. Despite the fact that jazz was a predominantly black art form in the 1940s and 1950s, during this time the club did not admit African American members, except as out-of-town correspondents, for fear of tarnishing its image. Members of the club were encouraged to attend regular meetings and jam sessions, listen to the radio station created by founding member Albert L. Diket (who would go on to become a professor of history and author of several books on Louisiana history), and receive The Second Line for free.

Over the years, the magazine profiled many accomplished jazz musicians, from Steve Lewis and Edmond Hall to Louis Armstrong. Regular contributors to the magazine included Doc Souchon.
