= Frank Weir =

British musician (1911–1981)

- Born: 30 January 1911; London, England, UK
- Died: 12 May 1981 (aged 70) Chelsea, London, England
- Genres: Jazz
- Occupation: Orchestra leader
- Instruments: Saxophone, clarinet
- Label: Decca

Frank Weir (30 January 1911 – 12 May 1981) was a British saxophonist, orchestra leader and jazz musician. He reached number 1 one on the UK Singles Chart in 1954 with Vera Lynn on a recording of the song "My Son, My Son", receiving positive reviews in Variety, Cash Box and Billboard.

His version of "The Happy Wanderer" became one of the most popular recordings of 1954, in both the UK and the US. It featured Weir's soprano saxophone solos between verses. It reached number 12 on the NME's short-lived "Best Selling Singles By British Artists" chart in 1954, on which "The Little Shoemaker" made number 10 and "The Never Never Land" made number 4. Six years later, in 1960, he had his final hit with "Caribbean Honeymoon", which reached a peak position of number 42 on the UK Singles Chart.

== Other recordings ==
- "Mister Cuckoo" / "If Ever You Go To Paree" - Parlophone R4157
- "What a Difference a Day Makes" / "Together" - Decca F8501
- "The Never Never Land" / "The Little Shoemaker" - Decca F 10324 (1954)
- "Parisien" "Phillips 326525 BF 1962"

== See also ==
- First English Public Jam Session
