= Dick McDonough =

American jazz guitarist and banjoist (1904–1938)

Background information
- Born: Richard Tobin McDonough; July 30, 1904; New York, New York, U.S.
- Died: May 25, 1938 New York, New York, U.S.
- Genre: Jazz
- Occupation: Musician
- Instruments: Guitar, tenor banjo
- Years active: 1921–1938

Richard Tobin McDonough (July 30, 1904 – May 25, 1938) was an American jazz guitarist and banjoist. Perhaps best remembered for his duets with fellow guitarist Carl Kress, McDonough appeared on numerous record sessions and radio broadcasts throughout the 1920s and 1930s.

McDonough began playing banjo and mandolin in high school. An athlete, he initially played left-handed because, according to McDonough, that was how he held his hockey stick. At Georgetown University, he performed professionally at weekend dances and two years later started a band. He attended Columbia Law School after college and while there played with bands in New York City. McDonough played with Red Nichols in 1927 as a banjoist, and soon after played with Paul Whiteman. He began studying the guitar and eventually was in demand for session work, recording with The Dorsey Brothers, Red Nichols, and Miff Mole. In the 1930s, he performed in a duo with jazz guitarist Carl Kress and cut several sessions with an orchestra under his own name, in addition to backing many other recording artists.

Other credits include session work with Mildred Bailey, Smith Ballew, The Boswell Sisters, Rube Bloom, Chick Bullock, The Charleston Chasers, Cliff Edwards, Gene Gifford, Benny Goodman, Adelaide Hall, Annette Hanshaw, Billie Holiday, Baby Rose Marie, Glenn Miller, Irving Mills, Red McKenzie, Johnny Mercer, Red Norvo, Fred Rich, Adrian Rollini, Pee Wee Russell, Ben Selvin, Artie Shaw, Frank Signorelli, Jack Teagarden, Claude Thornhill, Frankie Trumbauer, Joe Venuti, Don Voorhees, and Ethel Waters. He played in the Jam Session at Victor with Fats Waller, Bunny Berigan, and George Wettling.

McDonough had a wife, Dorothy Wiggman. He struggled with alcohol abuse during his adult life and died, aged 34, of pneumonia in May 1938 at the LeRoy Sanitarium after an operation.

== Discography ==
- 1936-37 - Dick McDonough and His Orchestra Vol. 1 (Swing Time)
- 1936-37 - Dick McDonough and His Orchestra Vol. 2 (Swing Time)
- 1934-37 - The Guitar Genius of Dick McDonough & Carl Kress in the Thirties (Jazz Archives, 1976)
- 1934-37 - Pioneers of the Jazz Guitar (Yazoo, 1992) (Karl Cress only in four tracks)

== See also ==
- A Jam Session at Victor (1937 jam session in which McDonough participated)
