= Celia Lipton =

British actress, singer and philanthropist (1923–2011)

Celia Lipton

Cecelia Lipton Farris (born Cecilia May Lipton; 25 December 1923 – 11 March 2011) was a British actress, singer and philanthropist.

== Biography ==
Celia May Lipton was born to Sydney Lipton, a violinist and bandleader, who starred in Let's Make a Night of It, and May Johnston Parker, on 25 December 1923 in Edinburgh, Scotland.

She started her career as a singer in England and acted in movies. In 1952, she moved to New York City. She married Victor Farris, the inventor of the paper milk carton, in 1956. They moved into a house in Palm Beach, Florida, formerly owned by the Vanderbilt family. When he died in 1985, he left her US$100 million.

She was a donor and fundraiser for the Salvation Army, the American Heart Association, the National Trust for Scotland, the Great Ormond Street Children's Hospital, the American Red Cross, The Prince’s Trust, the Duke of Edinburgh Trust, the American Ballet Theatre and the Norton Museum of Art. She also supported AIDS research. She was a Dame of Grace of the Venerable Order of Saint John.

== Death ==
Celia Lipton Farris died on 11 March 2011 in Palm Beach, Florida, aged 87. She had two adopted daughters, Marian and CeCe.

== Filmography ==
- Calling Paul Temple (1948)
- This Was a Woman (1948)
- The Tall Headlines (1952)
- Goodyear Television Playhouse (episode "The Personal Touch", 1954)
- Robert Montgomery Presents (episodes "The Hunchback of Notre Dame: Part 1" and "The Hunchback of Notre Dame: Part 2", 1954)
- B.L. Stryker (episode "The Dancer's Touch", 1989)

== Bibliography ==
- My Three Lives (autobiography, 2008)
