= Jon Stratton =

Australian academic

- Education: Bradford University, University of Essex
- Occupations: Academic and scholar in cultural studies
- Years active: 1980–present
- Awards: Rockefeller Fellowship (1998)
- Website: University of South Australia

Jon Stratton is an Australian academic and scholar in the field of cultural studies, media studies and popular music studies. He has sole authored 14 books, co-edited four collections, co-edited three journal special issues and written over 80 book chapters and over 100 articles in fully refereed journals. For over 30 years, he has been a media commentator in print, radio, and television.

== Education and career ==
Stratton studied European Literature, History of Ideas and Sociology as part of his first degree at Bradford University. Stratton was a member of the Drama Society which functioned under the direction of the University Fellow in Theatre, Chris Parr. Stratton performed in many first-run productions of plays by early career playwrights, some of whom became important in British avant-garde theatre. These included David Edgar, Howard Brenton and Richard Crane who later was associate director of Brighton Theatre.

Among the plays in which Stratton performed were David Edgar's The End (1972), a history of the Campaign for Nuclear Disarmament, Howard Brenton's Scott of the Antarctic (1971), also known as Scott of the Antarctic on Ice, and Richard Crane's Crippen: A Music-Hall Melodrama (1971), which the cast took to the Edinburgh Fringe Festival in the same year.

Stratton has a PhD in sociology from the University of Essex and has worked in Australia since 1981. He has taught at universities in Brisbane (Griffith University, Queensland University of Technology, University of Queensland), Armidale (University of New England), Darwin (Northern Territory University), and Perth (Curtin University) (Murdoch University).

Much of Stratton's work critically examines aspects of everyday life, centered on issues of identity and cultural specificity. In the 2000s Stratton has increasingly focused on popular music. His published works include articles on soap operas, subculture, cyberspace, postmodernity, the body, and the role of race and multiculturalism in Australian culture. Stratton has published three books on issues associated with Jewishness and identity. Stratton's more recent publications examine cultural aspects of popular music. Many of these publications discuss popular music in Australia.

=== Academic Achievements ===
Stratton was vice-president of the Australasian Cultural Studies Association between 2000 and 2004. He co-edited the Transnational Cultural Studies series for University of Illinois Press between 1997 and 2000. In 1998, Stratton held a Rockefeller Fellowship at the International Forum for United States' Studies at the University of Iowa.The same year Stratton was a Visiting Research Fellow at the University of California, Santa Cruz. In 1994 Stratton held a Visiting Research position at the Program for Cultural Studies, East-West Center, Honolulu, Hawai’i.

Stratton has been the chief investigator for two Australian Research Council Grants. In 1995-1997 Stratton, along with Professor Ien Ang who was joint Chief Investigator, was the recipient of an ARC Large Grant: Reimagining Asians in Multicultural Australia. In 2012-2014 Stratton was Chief Investigator on an ARC Discovery grant examining the cultural history of popular music in Perth, Western Australia.

Stratton is on the editorial boards of Continuum: Journal of Media and Cultural Studies, the European Journal of Cultural Studies, and Cultural Studies.

Stratton is the foundation editor and senior editor of the Bloomsbury series, 33 1/3 Oceania. The first book in the series was published in 2022.

Stratton is actively publishing and is an adjunct professor in Cultural Studies in UniSa Creative at the University of South Australia.

Stratton had a weekly radio slot discussing cultural matters on ABC Perth during 1993–1994, 1996–1999, 2000–2008. From 2024 Stratton has had a bi-weekly spot on the ABC Perth breakfast show discussing the history of aspects of popular music. Stratton has also been interviewed on Brisbane's 4zzz, ABC's Radio National and numerous other radio stations. In addition, Stratton has been interviewed on Australian television stations including Channel 7, Channel 9, Channel 10 and the ABC. Stratton has also published in The Conversation.

== Bibliography ==
Stratton has published the following books:

- Stratton, Jon (1987). The Virgin Text: Fiction, Sexuality and Ideology. Harvester and University of Oklahoma Press. ISBN 0-8061-2054-1.
- Stratton, Jon (1990). Writing Sites: A Genealogy of the Postmodern World. Harvester and University of Michigan Press. ISBN 0-472-10190-0.
- Stratton, Jon (1992). The Young Ones: Working Class Culture, Consumption and the Category of Youth. Perth: Black Swan Press. ISBN 0-646-09647-8.
- Stratton, Jon (1996). The Desirable Body: cultural fetishism and the erotics of consumption. Manchester, UK: Manchester University Press. ISBN 0-7190-4701-3.
- Stratton, Jon (1998). Race Daze: Australia in identity crisis. Sydney, NSW: Pluto Press. ISBN 1-86403-053-4.
- Stratton, Jon (2000). Coming Out Jewish: constructing ambivalent identities. London, UK: Routledge. ISBN 0-415-22208-7.
- Stratton, Jon (2007). Australian Rock: essays on popular music. Perth, WA: API Network Books. ISBN 978-1-920845-46-9.
- Stratton, Jon (2008). Jewish Identity in Western Pop Culture: The Holocaust and Trauma Through Modernity. New York City: Palgrave Macmillan. ISBN 978-0-230-60474-2.
- Stratton, Jon (2009). Jews, Race and Popular Music. Ashgate. ISBN 978-0-7546-6804-6.
- Bennett, Andy and Jon Stratton eds. (2010) Britpop and the English Music Tradition Ashgate ISBN 978-1-315-57037-2
- Stratton, Jon (2011) Uncertain Lives: Culture, Race and Neoliberalism in Australia Cambridge Scholars Publishing ISBN 978-1443833011
- Stratton, Jon (2014) When Music Migrates: Crossing British and European Racial Faultlines 1945–2010 Ashgate ISBN 978-0-367-87942-6
- Stratton, Jon and Nabeel Zuberi eds. (2014) Black Popular Music in Britain since 1945 Ashgate ISBN 978-1-138-50487-5
- Stratton, Jon and Jon Dale with Tony Mitchell (2020) An Anthology of. Australian Albums: Critical Engagements Bloomsbury ISBN 978-1-5013-3987-5
- Stratton, Jon (2020) Multiculturalism, Whiteness and Otherness in Australia Palgrave Macmillan ISBN 978-3-030-50079-5
- Stratton, Jon (2022) Spectacle, Fashion and the Dancing Experience in Britain 1960-1990 Palgrave Macmillan ISBN 978-3-031-09012-7
- Stratton, Jon (2023) Human Frailty [on the album by Hunters and Collectors], Bloomsbury ISBN 978-1-5013-9785-1

Stratton has also coedited the following journal issues:

- Andy Bennett, Jon Stratton and Richard Peterson eds. Australian Music Scenes, special issue of Continuum: Journal of Media & Cultural Studies, vol 22, no 5, 2008.
- Suvendrini Perera, Jon Stratton eds. The Border, the Asylum Seeker and the State of Exception, special issue of Continuum: Journal of Media & Cultural Studies, vol 23, no 5, 2009.
- Jon Stratton and Peter Beilharz eds. Way Out West: Mapping Western Australia, special issue of Thesis Eleven, vol 135, no 1, 2016
