= Harry Parry =

Welsh jazz clarinetist and bandleader (1912–1956)

- Born: Owen Henry Parry; 22 January 1912; Bangor, Wales
- Died: 11 October 1956 (aged 44) London, England
- Genres: Jazz
- Occupations: Musician, bandleader
- Instruments: Clarinet; cornet; tenor horn; flugelhorn; drums; violin; saxophone
- Spouse: Jeannie Bradbury (m. 1945; div. 1956)

Owen Henry Parry (22 January 1912 – 11 October 1956) was a Welsh jazz clarinetist and bandleader.

== Biography ==
Parry was born in Bangor, Wales. He played cornet, tenor horn, flugelhorn, drums, and violin as a child, and began on clarinet and saxophone in 1927. After moving to London in 1932, he played with several dance bands, including Percival Mackey's, then led his own six-piece unit. He was engaged at the St. Regis Hotel in 1940 when he was selected by the BBC to lead the band for their Radio Rhythm Club show. He then proceeded to record over 100 titles for Parlophone Records with his sextet, which included George Shearing and Doreen Villiers as members.

Following World War II Parry worked extensively for radio and television, including as a disc jockey. He toured worldwide as a bandleader in the late 1940s and 1950s, including in the Middle East and India.

In 1946 he appeared with his Radio Rhythm Club sextet in the film What Do We Do Now?.

Parry was stylistically indebted to Benny Goodman, a comparison not lost on contemporary critics. He died in his flat in Mayfair, London, in October 1956.

Parry married Jeannie Bradbury, a singer for the BBC's wartime General Forces Programme in 1945, but the pair divorced in 1956.

== See also ==
- First English Public Jam Session

== Biography ==
- Clarrie Henry, "Harry Parry". Grove Jazz online.
- Gwilym Arthur Jones, PARRY, OWEN HENRY (HARRY PARRY; 1912-1956), jazz musician, Dictionary of Welsh Biography
