= Freddy Grant =

British Guiana-born jazz and calypso musician

Frederick Dighton Grant (Nov 3rd 1905 – Feb 13th 1982) was a Guyanese jazz and calypso musician, composer and arranger who played saxophone and clarinet. Between the mid-1930s and mid-1950s he was active in Britain, before moving to the United States.

== Biography ==
Grant was born in Georgetown, Guyana (what was then British Guiana) and began his music career at the age of seven.

He toured South America as a member of Vicente Gomez's band, before moving to Trinidad in 1933 where he joined the Trinidad Constabulary Band. In 1937, he moved to England, and worked with several jazz and swing bands, including those led by Joe Appleton, Fela Sowande, Rudolph Dunbar, Johnny Claes, and Cyril Blake. In 1941 he joined the Royal Air Force for three years, playing in the central band, and on his discharge joined the bands led by Carlo Krahmer and Leslie "Jiver" Hutchinson.

Immediately after the end of the Second World War, in 1945, he featured with his own band, the West Indian Calypsonians, in concerts organised by record producer Denis Preston, sometimes being billed as "Frederico and the Calypsonians", "Freddy Grant's Demerarians", or "Freddy's Calypso Serenaders". He played again with Appleton, and with Kenny Graham's Afro-Cubists, before joining forces with Humphrey Lyttelton in 1952 and recording with him for Parlophone Records as the Grant-Lyttelton Paseo Jazz Band. Promoted by Preston, the band toured with singers Young Tiger and Bill Rogers.

Grant recorded with a number of calypso stars, including Lord Beginner and, most notably, Lord Kitchener, collaborating on the Windrush anthem, 'London Is the Place for Me', where he can be heard on clarinet. He also worked in other bands and nightclubs in London, including Cyril Blake's Jigs Club Band, recorded live with Harry Parry in Soho in 1941 with guitarist Lauderic Caton. During his time in London, he studied at the Royal Academy of Music and served as a musical director for the BBC on overseas broadcasts 'London Jazz' and 'Calling the West Indies'.

In 1947, Grant performed at a jazz concert at Birmingham Town Hall, alongside American jazz musician and composer, Spencer Williams.

In 1953, he emigrated to New York, where he performed as Sir Freddy Grant and led his own calypso band. He performed at Carnegie Hall three times between 1955 and 1957 with his show 'Music of the Caribees', and in 1957 recorded the album Calypso under Sir Freddy Grant's Caribbean Troubadours for Bethlehem Records. On the record's sleeve notes, the American PR manager Joe Quinn writes:

"A sage observer recently pointed out that the entertainment industry was wiggling its hips and broadening its "As" to follow the Calypso trend. Through birth-right and a sound musical education, Freddy Grant has pioneered this culture to its present state. These authentic recordings are a milestone in his colorful career."

Grant died in New York City in 1982 and was interred in the Woodlawn Cemetery (Bronx, New York).

Some of Freddy's music can be heard on the compilation 'London Is The Place For Me, Trinidadian Calypso in London, (1950-1956) by Honest Jon Records.
