= Evelyn Dove =

British singer and actress (1902–1969)

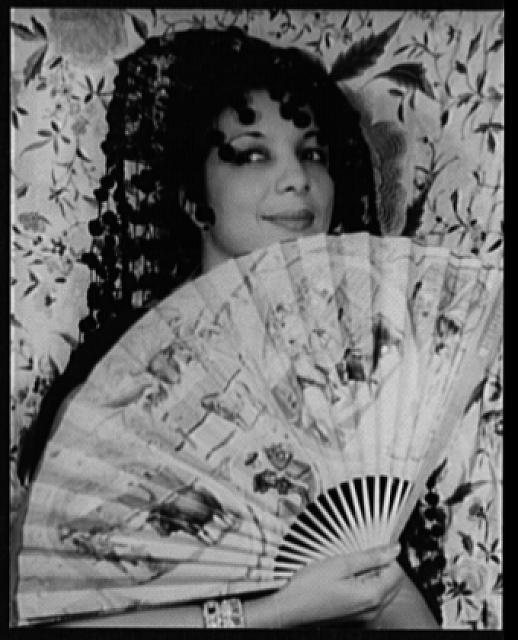
- Portrait of Dove, 1935, by Carl Van Vechten
- Born: Evelyn Mary Dove; 11 January 1902; London, England
- Died: 7 March 1987 (aged 85); Epsom, Surrey, England
- Other names: Norma Winchester; Evelyn Augusta Luke
- Education: Royal Academy of Music
- Occupations: Singer, actress
- Parent(s): Augusta (née Winchester) and Frans Dove
- Relatives: Frank Dove (brother); Mabel Dove Danquah (sister)
- Family: Dove family

Evelyn Mary Dove (11 January 1902 – 7 March 1987) was a British singer and actress, who early in her career drew comparisons with Josephine Baker. Of Sierra Leone Creole and English parentage, Dove is recognized as a "trailblazing performer": in 1939, she made history as the first black singer to feature on BBC Radio, building a solid reputation not only through her work in Britain but also internationally, travelling to France, Germany, Italy, Austria, the Netherlands, Hungary, the United States, India and Spain. She was featured as a Google Doodle on what would have been her 117th birthday in 2019.

== Family background ==
Evelyn Mary Dove was born on 11 January 1902 at the Lying-in Hospital, Endell Street, London. She was the daughter of leading Sierra Leonean barrister (Francis) Frans Dove (1869–1949), who became the first President of the Gold Coast Bar Association, and Augusta, née Winchester, from England. Her parents later divorced. Evelyn's older brother Frank Dove, who studied law at Oxford University, was called up by the British army in 1915 and fought at the Battle of Cambrai, being awarded the Military Medal. Her younger half-sister was Ghanaian journalist and politician Mabel Dove Danquah.

== Early years ==
Evelyn Dove studied singing, piano, and elocution at the Royal Academy of Music from 1917 until 1919, when she graduated, and on 27 September that year married Milton Alphonso Luke in London. Howard Rye records that she was using the name "Norma Winchester" when she became a member of the Southern Syncopated Orchestra (SSO), a band composed of British West Indian and West African and American musicians who were popularising black music on the UK club scene. On 9 October 1921, eight or nine members of the SSO and around 27 other passengers drowned when the SS Rowan sailing from Glasgow to Dublin collided with another ship and sank. Dove and other SSO survivors such as Cyril Blake took part on 14 October in the "Survivors Sacred Concert".

When in 1925 the all-Black revue Chocolate Kiddies toured Europe from New York, she joined the cast, replacing Lottie Gee, who had to return to the US, and the show toured western Europe for a year, before going to the USSR to play in Leningrad and Moscow, where the audience included Stalin, according to Stephen Bourne, who has researched and written about Dove for the Dictionary of National Biography and elsewhere.

Dove's career burgeoned internationally in the 1920s and '30s. She was performing at London's Mile End Empire in June 1926, then five months later Evelyn Dove and Her Plantation Creoles – "the only singing and dancing act of its kind in Europe" – appeared at Wintergarten in Berlin, and her revue appeared in the Netherlands in February 1927. She was very popular in Italy, where she lived for some years, before in 1932 going to France to replace Josephine Baker starring in a revue at the Casino de Paris. She subsequently went to the US, where in 1936 she was the headline cabaret act at the famous Harlem nightclub Connie's Inn. In New York she was photographed by the celebrated photographer Carl Van Vechten.

Her travels also took her to Bombay, India, where on 7 October 1937 The Evening News of India reviewed her opening-night performance at the Harbour Bar:

She is an artist of international reputation, one of the leading personalities of Europe's entertainment world. She is described as the closest rival of the great Josephine Baker herself. Evelyn didn't get just the big hand. She got an ovation, a roaring welcome.

== 1939–1949 ==
The decade from 1939 to 1949 marked the height of Dove's career in Britain, when she did much notable radio work broadcasting with the BBC. As Stephen Bourne notes: "Throughout World War II she enjoyed the same appeal as the 'Forces Sweetheart', Vera Lynn. The BBC employed Evelyn all through the war, and she proved to be one of radio’s most popular singers, appearing in a wide range of music and variety programmes."

A memo from producer Eric Fawcett to a colleague on 6 June 1947 states:

She is a contralto with a perfect microphone quality and although I have used her mostly in music of negro origin this has ranged from spirituals to Samuel Coleridge-Taylor. She is, of course, a highly trained singer. She is an extremely charming person with a very attractive personality. I would rate her the best coloured contralto in this country.

Dove appeared regularly on such popular music and variety radio programmes as Rhapsody in Black, Calling the West Indies, Variety Bandbox, Music For You, Caribbean Carnival, and Mississippi Nights. Particularly successful was the series Serenade in Sepia (1945–47), for which she made more than 50 broadcasts with Trinidadian folk-singer Edric Connor, attracting so many listeners that the BBC decided to make a television version.

In 1947, Dove and Connor – along with other artists including Mable Lee, Cyril Blake and his Calypso Band, Buddy Bradley, Winifred Atwell, and Adelaide Hall – performed in Variety in Sepia, an early example of a UK television special dedicated to Black talent, which was filmed live on 7 October 1947 at the RadiOlympia Theatre, Alexandra Palace, London, and aired on BBC TV.

== Later career ==
Leaving the BBC in 1949, Dove worked in cabaret in India, Paris and Spain. When she returned to Britain at the end of 1950, as Stephen Bourne has written, she struggled to find work, "though she did appear in the cast of London Melody with ice-skater Belita and comedian Norman Wisdom at London's Empress Hall in 1951. Despite her experience and talent, she found herself understudying Muriel Smith in the role of Bloody Mary in the Rodgers and Hammerstein musical South Pacific at Drury Lane." In 1955, her search for work led her to apply for a job as a Post Office telephonist, asking the BBC for a reference. In 1956 the BBC cast her as Eartha Kitt's mother in a television drama called Mrs Patterson, and more television work followed, and then a role on the West End musical stage, as one of the stars of Langston Hughes's Simply Heavenly, directed by Laurence Harvey. Bourne notes that another cast member was Isabelle Lucas, who later recalled:

We became friends, but Evelyn's life took a bad turn. Her reputation as a singer faded, and she became very ill. She lost contact with her family. Her spirit was broken.

Evelyn Dove died of pneumonia at Horton Hospital in Epsom, Surrey, aged 85, on 7 March 1987, registered as "Evelyn Dove, otherwise Brantley" (she had married her third husband William Newton Brantley, in 1958, having previously been married to Felix John Basil Inglis Allen in 1941).

== Legacy ==
Dove features on the two-CD compilation Negro Spirituals – The Concert Tradition 1909 – 1948 singing the spiritual "Couldn't Hear Nobody Pray".

On 18 September 1993, Moira Stuart featured Evelyn Dove in Salutations, a BBC Radio 2 series celebrating black British and British-based musical entertainers who came to fame between the 1930s and 1950s.

A biography by Stephen Bourne, entitled Evelyn Dove: Britain's Black Cabaret Queen, was published in October 2016 by Jacaranda Books. Bourne appeared on the BBC's Antiques Road Show being interviewed about Dove by Emma Dabiri.

On 11 January 2019, which would have been Dove's 117th birthday, Google celebrated her life in one of their first "doodles" of the year.

On 29 September 2023, a Nubian Jak/Battersea Society commemorative blue plaque was unveiled outside a house in Barnard Road, Battersea, where Dove had live when young.

In October 2024, Dove's great-niece, Tiffany Dove-Abbam (daughter of Gisela Abbam), formed The Dove Foundation for Global Change in honour of the women in the Dove family.

== Selected filmography ==
- 1954: Halcyon Days – Mrs Carter
- 1956: Mrs. Patterson – Anna Hicks
- 1957: Another Part of the Forest (ITV Play of the Week) – Coralee
- 1958: The Green Pastures (BBC Television, Sunday Night Theatre) – Noah's wife
