= Albert King (disambiguation) =

Albert King (1923–1992) was an American blues musician.

Albert King may also refer to:

- Albert King (basketball) (born 1959), retired American basketball player
- Albert F. A. King (1841–1914), English-American physician called to duty during the assassination of Abraham Lincoln
- Bertie King (1912–1981), Jamaican jazz and mento musician
- Albert King (umpire) (1878–1946), South African cricket umpire
- Albert Francis King (1854–1945), American painter
- Albert King, a fictional character and boss in the video game Batman: Arkham Knight

== See also ==
- Bert King (disambiguation)
