= Stephen Bourne (writer) =

British writer, film and social historian

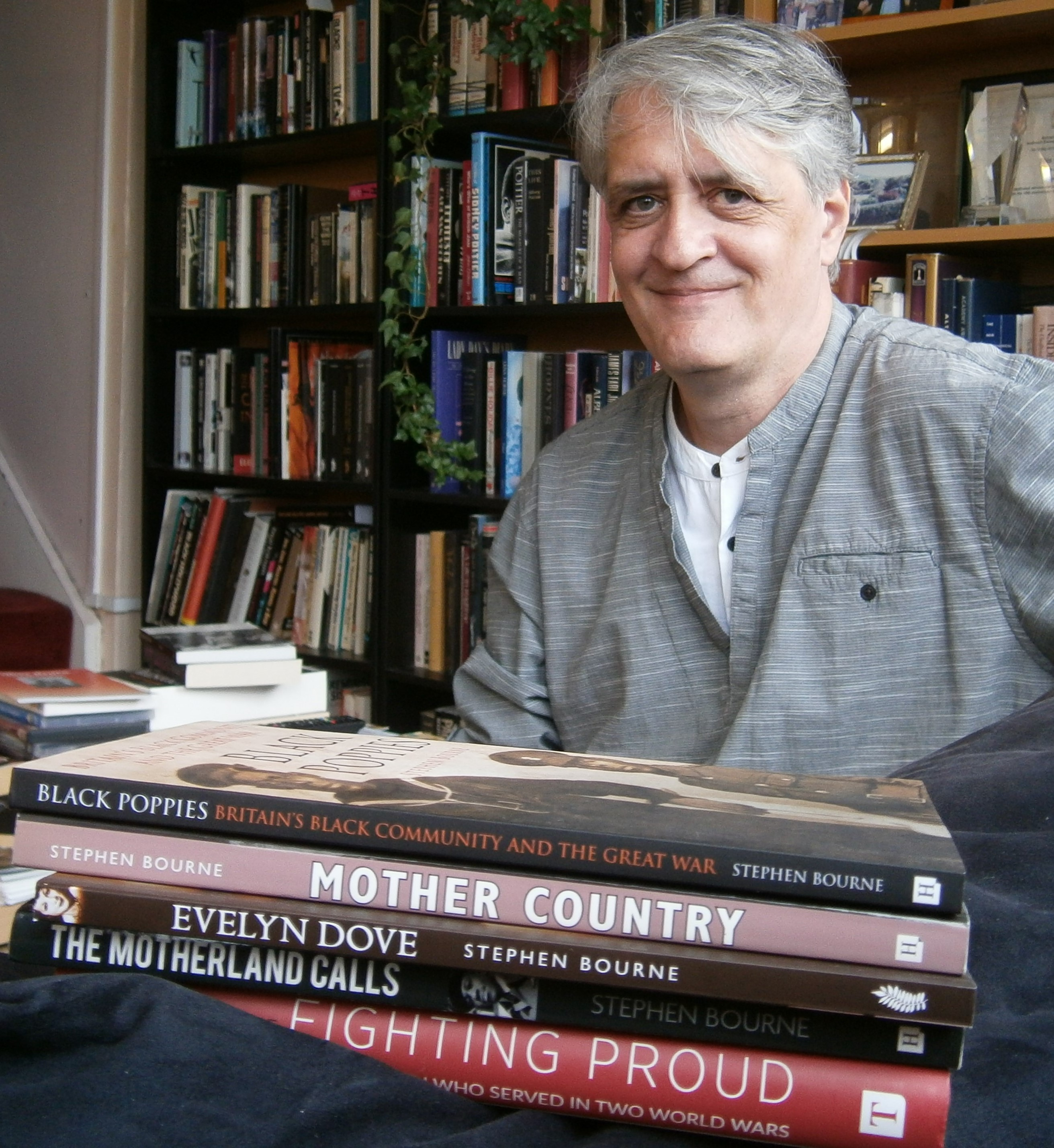
- Born: Camberwell, London, United Kingdom
- Education: London College of Printing; De Montfort University (MPhil)
- Occupations: Writer, film and social historian specialising in black culture
- Website: stephenbourne.co.uk

Stephen Bourne is a British writer, film and social historian specialising in the history of Black British people and gay culture in the United Kingdom.

== Career ==
Stephen Bourne was a research officer at the British Film Institute on a project that documented the history of Black people in British television. He wrote Brief Encounters: Lesbians and Gays in British Cinema 1930–71, published in 1996. His book Black in the British Frame: Black People in British Film and Television 1896–1996 was published in 1998. His Black in the British Frame: The Black Experience in British Film and Television followed on it in 2001. He also wrote books on American actors Elisabeth Welch, Ethel Waters, Butterfly McQueen, and Nina Mae McKinney. Bourne co-authored two books with Esther Bruce about her life as a seamstress in London.

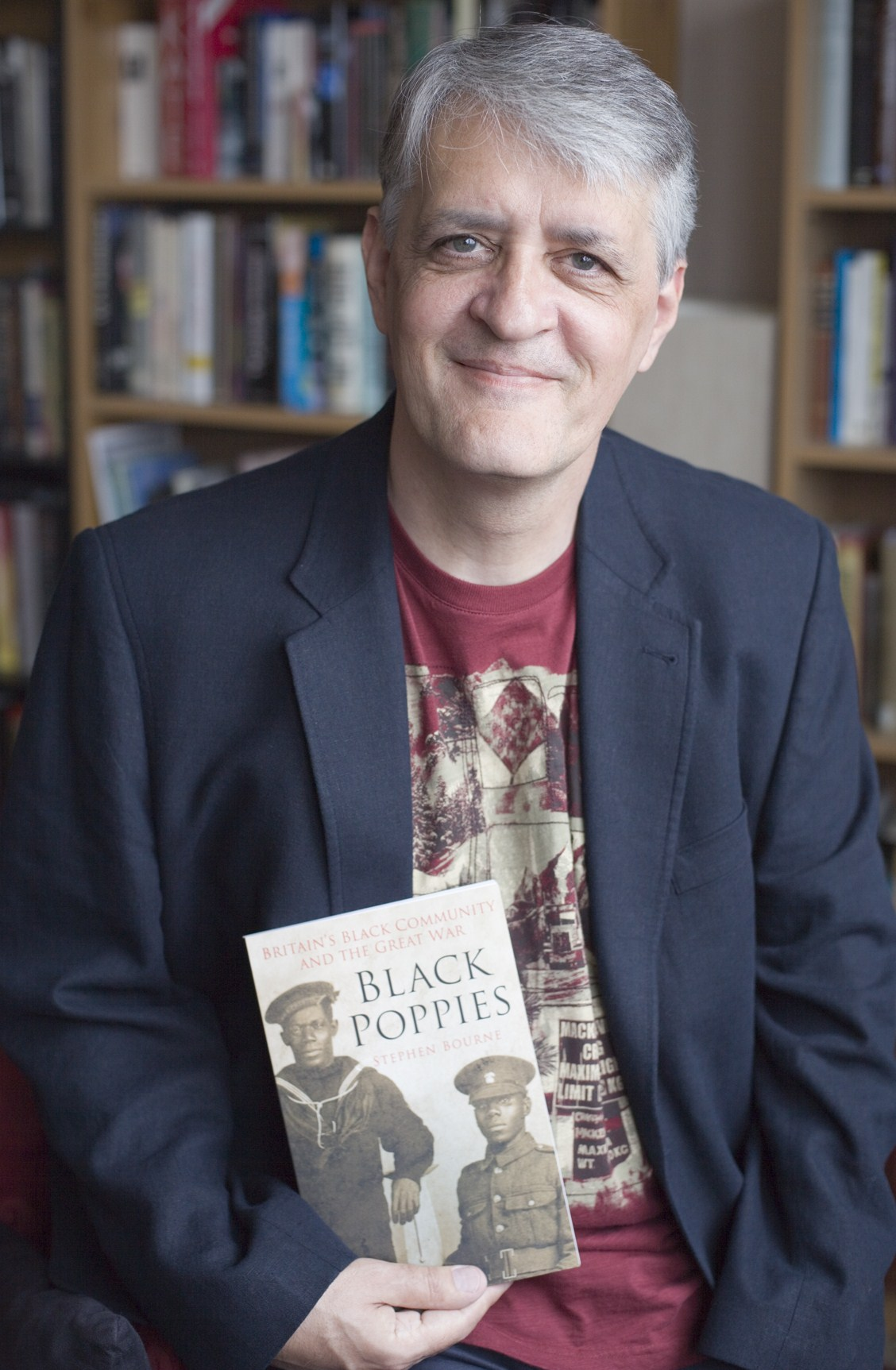
Bourne with his book Black Poppies

In 2014, Bourne's book Black Poppies: Britain's Black Community and the Great War was published by The History Press. Reviewing it in The Independent, Bernardine Evaristo said: "Until historians and cultural map-makers stop ignoring the historical presence of people of colour, books such as this one provide a powerful, revelatory counterbalance to the whitewashing of British history."

Following the publication of the Commission on Race and Ethnic Disparities in March 2021, Bourne revealed that he was listed as a contributor to the report without his knowledge, stating that he felt manipulated.

His book Deep Are the Roots: Trailblazers Who Changed Black British Theatre was published in 2021 and his book Amanda Ira Aldridge and Avril Coleridge-Taylor: Getting the Tempo Right (about British composers Amanda Ira Aldridge and Avril Coleridge-Taylor) in 2024.

Bourne's memoir Thursday's Child: A Life Between the Lines was published by Jacaranda Books in September 2026.

== Awards ==
In 2002, Bourne received the Metropolitan Police Volunteer Award for his work as independent adviser on critical incidents. In 2013, Bourne was nominated for a Southwark Heritage Blue Plaque for his work as a community historian and Southwark Police independent adviser. He came second with 1,025 votes.

In 2006, Bourne was awarded a Master of Philosophy (MPhil) degree from De Montfort University for his thesis on gay male representation in British television drama 1936 to 1989.

In May 2017, he was honoured at the 12th Screen Nation Awards for his work on the history of Black Britons in film and television.

In 2017, he received an Honorary Fellowship from London South Bank University.

== TV and radio ==
Bourne has been interviewed on BBC Radio London.

In 1993, for Salutations, Bourne received a Race in the Media Award for Best Radio Documentary from the Commission for Racial Equality (CRE). Salutations was a nine-part series that Bourne conceived and scripted for Ladbroke Radio/BBC Radio 2, celebrating the achievements of Black African, Caribbean and British singers and musicians from the 1930s to the 1960s. Subjects included Leslie "Hutch" Hutchinson, Reginald Foresythe, Evelyn Dove, Leslie Thompson, Leslie "Jiver" Hutchinson, Ken "Snakehips" Johnson, Cyril Blake, Rudolph Dunbar, Fela Sowande, Edric Connor, Winifred Atwell, Ray Ellington, Cy Grant, Geoff Love and Shirley Bassey. The following year, Bourne received a second CRE award in the same category for Black in the West End, a celebration of Black musical theatre in London's West End.

== Black British theatre ==
Bourne was the recipient of a Wingate Scholarship in 2011.

== Publications ==
- The Sun Shone on Our Side of the Street: Aunt Esther's Story, with Esther Bruce, ECOHP, 1991, ISBN 1871338077
- Brief Encounters: Lesbians and Gays in British Cinema 1930–71, Cassell, 1996, ISBN 0304332860
- Aunt Esther's Story, with Esther Bruce, ECOHP, 1996, ISBN 1871338123
- Black in the British Frame: Black People in British Film and Television 1896-1996, Cassell, 1998, ISBN 9780304333752
- A Ship and a Prayer: The Black Presence in Hammersmith and Fulham, with Sav Kyriacou, ECOHP, 1999, ISBN 187133814X
- Black in the British Frame: The Black Experience in British Film and Television, Cassell/Continuum, 2001, ISBN 0826455395
- Sophisticated Lady: A Celebration of Adelaide Hall, ECOHP, 2001, ISBN 1871338158
- Elisabeth Welch: Soft Lights and Sweet Music, Scarecrow Press, 2005, ISBN 0810854139
- Speak of Me As I Am: The Black Presence in Southwark Since 1600, Southwark Council, 2005, ISBN 0905849426
- Ethel Waters: Stormy Weather, Scarecrow Press, 2007, ISBN 0810859025
- Butterfly McQueen Remembered, Scarecrow Press, 2008, ISBN 081086018X
- Dr. Harold Moody, Southwark Council, 2008, ISBN 978-0-905849-43-0
- Mother Country: Britain's Black Community on the Home Front 1939–45, The History Press, 2010, ISBN 0752456105
- Nina Mae McKinney: The Black Garbo, BearManor Media, 2011, ISBN 9781593936587
- The Motherland Calls: Britain's Black Servicemen and Women 1939–1945, The History Press, 2012, ISBN 978-0-7524-6585-2
- Esther Bruce: A Black London Seamstress, with Esther Bruce, History and Social Action Publications, 2012, ISBN 978-0-9548943-7-5
- Black Poppies: Britain's Black Community and the Great War, The History Press, 2014, ISBN 075249760X
- Evelyn Dove: Britain's Black Cabaret Queen, Jacaranda Books, 2016, ISBN 9781909762350
- Fighting Proud: The Untold Story of the Gay Men Who Served in Two World Wars, I.B.Tauris, 2017/Bloomsbury Academic, 2019, ISBN 978-1-350-14322-7
- War to Windrush: Black Women in Britain 1939–1948, Jacaranda Books, 2018, ISBN 9781909762855
- Black Poppies: Britain's Black Community and the Great War (2nd edition, revised and updated), The History Press, 2019, ISBN 978-0-7509-9082-0
- Playing Gay in the Golden Age of British Television, The History Press, 2019, ISBN 978-0-7509-9013-4
- Under Fire: Black Britain in Wartime 1939-45, The History Press, 2020, ISBN 978-0-7509-9435-4
- Deep Are the Roots: Trailblazers Who Changed Black British Theatre, The History Press, 2021, ISBN 978-0-7509-9629-7
- Black Poppies: The Story of Britain's Black Community in the First World War (Young Readers Edition), The History Press, 2022, ISBN 978-0-7509-9963-2
- Lena Horne: The MGM Years, BearManor Media, 2023, ISBN 979-8887712369
- Amanda Ira Aldridge and Avril Coleridge-Taylor: Getting the Tempo Right, Historycal Roots, 2024, ISBN 979-8877958043
- Trailblazers of Black British Theatre: From Ira Aldridge to Cleo Laine, The History Press, 2025, ISBN 978-1803999234
- Thursday's Child: A Life Between the Lines, Jacaranda Books, 2026, ISBN 978-1-80675-028-3

== Contributor ==
- "Coming Clean: Soap Operas", in T. Daniels and J. Gerson (eds), The Colour Black: Black Images in British Television, BFI, 1989, ISBN 0-85170-232-5
- "Denying Her Place: Hattie McDaniel's Surprising Acts", in P. Cook and P. Dodd (eds), Women and Film: A Sight and Sound Reader, Scarlet Press, 1993, ISBN 1-85727-081-9
- R. Aldrich and G. Wotherspoon (eds), Who's Who in Gay and Lesbian History: From Antiquity to World War II, Routledge, 2001, ISBN 0-415-15982-2
- R. Aldrich and G. Wotherspoon (eds), Who's Who in Gay and Lesbian History: From World War II to the Present Day, Routledge, 2001, ISBN 0-415-22974-X
- "Secrets and Lies: Black Histories and British Historical Films", in C. Monk and A. Sargeant (eds), British Historical Cinema, Routledge, 2002, ISBN 0-415-23810-2
- "Black representation" and "Gay and lesbian representation", in B. McFarlane (ed.), The Encyclopedia of British Film, Methuen, 2003, ISBN 0-413-77526-7
- "Behind the Masks: Anthony Asquith and Brian Desmond Hurst", in R. Griffiths (ed.), British Queer Cinema, Routledge, 2006, ISBN 0-415-30779-1
- D. Dabydeen, J. Gilmore and C. Jones (eds), The Oxford Companion to Black British History, Oxford University Press, 2007, ISBN 978-0-19-280439-6
- "Colour Balance: Black British Television Stars", in J. Bell (ed.), Black Star: A BFI Compendium, BFI, 2016, ISBN 978-1844579716
- "Paving the Way: The Story of Annie Brewster", in J. Beula (ed.), Nursing a Nation: An Anthology of African and Caribbean Contributions to Britain's Health Services, Nu Jak Media Publishing, 2021, ISBN 978-1-8383687-0-8
- "Snakehips Swing" and "Sophisticated Ladies", in P. Bradshaw (ed.), Beyond the Bassline: 500 Years of Black British Music, British Library, 2024, ISBN 978-0712354899
- "A Massive Jigsaw Puzzle", in M. Ohajuru (ed.), "Who is John Blanke?: Historians and Artists Reimagine the Black Tudor Trumpeter", Canbury Press, 2025, ISBN 978-1914487484
- "Walk 4: Black History Walk", in R. Barton (ed.), "Twenty-One Urban Strolls in Camberwell", The Camberwell Society, 2025, ISBN 978-1-0369-0596-5
