= Ken "Snakehips" Johnson =

British jazz band-leader and dancer (1914–1941)

Ken Johnson
- Johnson, late 1930s
- Born: Kenrick Reginald Hijmans Johnson; 10 September 1914; Georgetown, British Guiana
- Died: 8 March 1941 (aged 26); London, England
- Other name: Snakehips
- Occupations: Swing band-leader; dancer

Kenrick Reginald Hijmans Johnson (10 September 1914 – 8 March 1941), nicknamed Snakehips, was a Guyanese swing band-leader and dancer. He was a leading figure in black British music of the 1930s and early 1940s before his death while performing at the Café de Paris, London, when it was hit by a German bomb in the Blitz during the Second World War.

Johnson was born in Georgetown, British Guiana (present-day Guyana). He showed some musical ability, but his early interest in a career in dancing displeased his father, who wished him to study medicine. He was educated in Britain, but instead of continuing on to university, he travelled to New York, perfecting dance moves and immersing himself in the vibrant jazz scene in Harlem. Tall and elegant, he modelled himself professionally on Cab Calloway. He returned to Britain and set up the Aristocrats (or Emperors) of Jazz, a mainly black swing band, with Leslie Thompson, a Jamaican musician. In 1937 he took control of the band through a renegotiated contract, resulting in the departure of Thompson and several musicians. Johnson filled the vacancies with musicians from the Caribbean; the band's popularity grew and its name changed to the West Indian Dance Orchestra.

From 1938 the band started broadcasting on BBC Radio, recorded their first discs and appeared in an early television broadcast. Increasingly popular, they were employed as the house band at the Café de Paris, an upmarket and fashionable nightclub located in a basement premises below a cinema. A German bombing raid on London in March 1941 hit the cinema, killing at least 34 and injuring dozens more. Johnson and one of the band's saxophonists were among those killed; several other band members were injured.

The West Indian Dance Orchestra were the leading swing band in Britain at the time, well-known and popular through their radio broadcasts, but their impact was more social than musical. As leader of a mainly black orchestra playing the most up-to-date music of the time, Johnson was seen as a pioneer for black musical leaders in the UK. When the band broke up after Johnson's death, the members had an impact on the nature and sound of British jazz. In 1940 Johnson had begun a relationship with Gerald Hamilton, a man twenty years his senior. After Johnson's death Hamilton never travelled without a framed photograph of him, always referring to him as "my husband".

== Biography ==
=== Early life ===
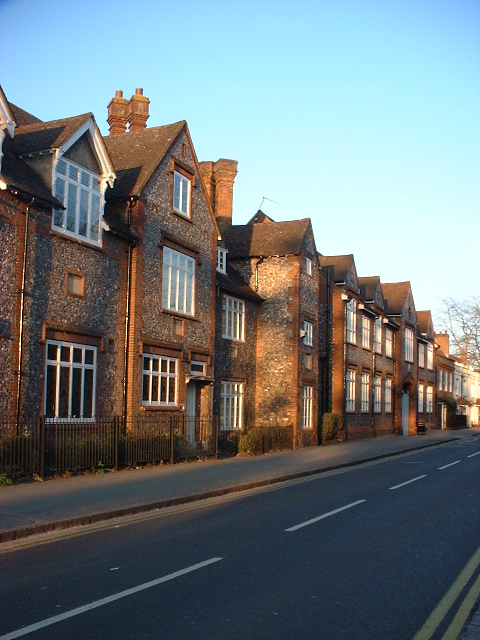
Sir William Borlase's Grammar School, where Johnson was educated

Kenrick Reginald Hijmans Johnson was born in Georgetown, British Guiana (present-day Guyana), on 10 September 1914. His parents were Dr Reginald Fitzherbert Johnson, a doctor and medical officer of health from British Guiana, and Anna Delphina Louisa née Hijmans, a nurse from Dutch Guiana (now Suriname). His uncle was the pianist Oscar Dummett.

Johnson appeared in a comb and paper band at his Georgetown school, Queen's College, and played the violin. His early interest in dancing was opposed by his father, who considered a future in the medical profession more appropriate for his son. To give him a British education and to further the possibility of a medical career, Kenrick was sent to the UK at the age of 14—arriving at Plymouth on 31 August 1929—for schooling at Sir William Borlase's Grammar School near Marlow, Buckinghamshire. He played cricket and football at the school; as a tall boy—he was eventually 6 feet 4 inches (1.93 m)—he was an excellent goalkeeper. He also played the violin in the school chapel, and danced for his friends.

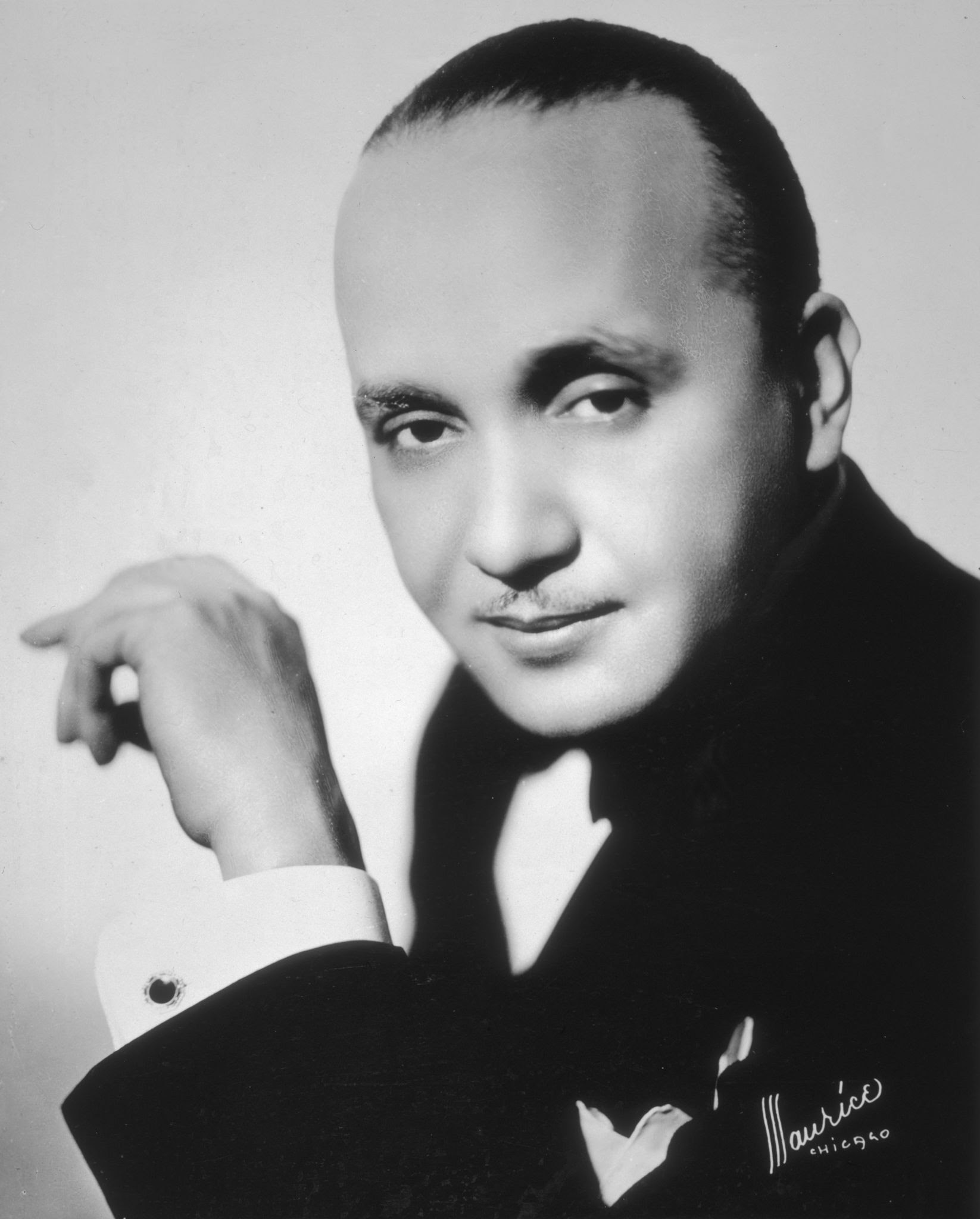
Fletcher Henderson, who encouraged Johnson and allowed him to conduct his orchestra

On leaving school in 1931, Johnson studied law at the University of London, but gave up to work as a dancer. He worked with travelling revue troupes and took professional lessons. His main influence was Buddy Bradley, a well-known African American dancer and choreographer who ran a dance school in the West End of London. (Note: Bradley was well-known in theatrical circles. He choreographed shows for C. B. Cochran and taught dance steps to Fred Astaire and Jack Buchanan.) Through Bradley's influence, Johnson was recorded in 1934 for the film Oh, Daddy!, and in December 1934 he travelled to Trinidad. He toured the Caribbean, dancing on stage, before moving on to the US, where he visited Harlem, New York. He spent his time in the US honing his tap dancing skills, and studying the styles of the local African American dancers. According to Val Wilmer, the writer on jazz, it was here that he "learnt to wind his hips in the suggestive manner that his nickname implied". According to Andrew Simons, Head of Music at the British Library, it is likely that Johnson also saw the act of Bill "Bojangles" Robinson, who performed a "stair dance" that was well-known on the New York vaudeville stage. (Note: Robinson also performed this dance in the 1935 film The Little Colonel.) Johnson met Fletcher Henderson, who encouraged him in a future band-leading career and allowed him to conduct his orchestra. While in the US he featured in two short films. He appeared on stage in August 1935 for a one-night performance in British Guiana; posters advertised him as "Ken 'Snakehips' Johnson, Direct in from Hollywood after contract with Warner Bros. Studios". He returned to Britain in 1936.

=== Career ===
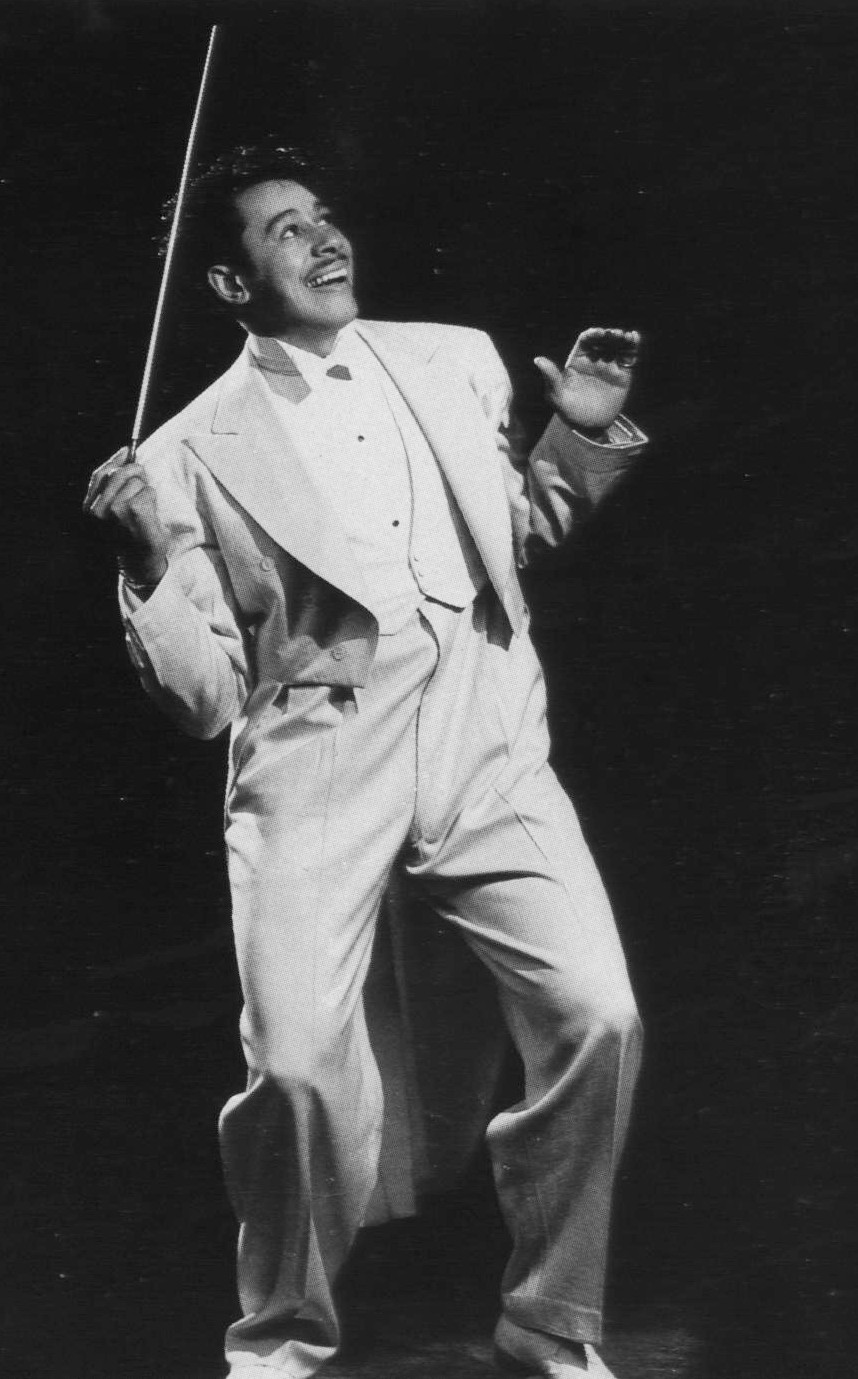
Cab Calloway, the entertainer and band-leader, on whom Johnson modelled himself

Johnson's experiences in Harlem motivated him to start his own swing band. According to Wilmer, British dance bands of the time "were technically proficient but generally lacked the ability then to 'swing' like African Americans". Johnson saw his music in "the context of black internationalism and Pan-Africanism that shaped London in the 1930s". Wanting to model himself on the entertainer and band-leader model, such as the American Cab Calloway—an elegant figure who led his swing orchestra in tails—Johnson began to build an all-black band. In 1936 he teamed up with the Jamaican trumpeter Leslie Thompson to form an all-black jazz band, the Aristocrats (or Emperors) of Jazz, sometimes the "Jamaican Emperors", who made their debut that April.

Thompson was the musical leader of the band. Wanting to achieve the same sounds as the American big bands, he said "I made them rehearse to get that lift that Jimmie Lunceford and [Duke] Ellington were getting on their records"; he described Johnson as "a stick wagger—he was no musician". While Johnson left the musical practice for Thompson to direct, he rehearsed his showmanship and dance moves. On saxophone the band included three Jamaicans (Bertie King, Louis Stephenson and Joe Appleton) and Robert Mumford-Taylor, who was of Sierra Leonean descent. Thompson was joined on trumpet by the Trinidadian Wally Bowen, the Jamaican Leslie "Jiver" Hutchinson and Arthur Dibbin, who was born in South Wales of West African descent. (Note: Hutchinson did not like the sobriquet "Jiver". As Wilmer explains, "he considered it belittled his musicianship and was racially stereotyping", although he retained the name professionally to avoid confusion with the singer and pianist Leslie "Hutch" Hutchinson.) On double bass they employed either the South African Bruce Vanderpoye or Abe "Pops" Clare from the Caribbean. Yorke de Souza, a Jamaican, was the pianist; Joe Deniz, who was born in South Wales of a father from the Cape Verde Islands, was the guitarist. As Thompson could not find suitable black trombonists, he employed Reg Amore and Freddie Greenslade, both of whom were white but would wear blackface to ensure the band were seen as an all-black ensemble.

Although the group struggled financially when they first started, they soon built a reputation and following. First performing in cinemas in outer London from April 1936, the band toured Britain, appearing on the variety circuit. Towards the end of 1936 Johnson and the band were recruited for a residency as the house band at the Old Florida Club in Old Bruton Mews, Mayfair, for a six-week trial—with an associated income of four or five times more than most nightclub bands. Johnson received £20 a week; the others a little less, but all did well at a time when the average wage was £5 a week. (Note: £20 in 1937 is approximately equivalent to £1,178 in 2025, and £5 is approximately equivalent to £294 in 2025, according to calculations based on Consumer Price Index measure of inflation.) In February 1937 Johnson and his manager, Ralph Deene, renegotiated the band's contract with the club in their names, omitting Thompson from the contract, effectively taking ownership of the orchestra. Thompson left, taking several members loyal to him. To fill the gaps in the orchestra, Johnson recruited four musicians he knew from Trinidad: the saxophonists George Roberts and Dave "Baba" Williams; Dave Wilkins on trumpet and Carl Barriteau on clarinet, although several of those who left returned over time. With Thompson gone from the band, Hutchinson took over the role of musical leader.

The band continued performing at the Old Florida Club and began taking day-time stage work. They were soon scouted at the Shepherd's Bush Empire by Leslie Perowne of the BBC's Variety Department. This led to their first radio broadcast on 11 January 1938 for a 30-minute segment on the BBC Regional Programme. It was the first of 43 broadcasts they were to make. The following month they recorded their first discs, "Goodbye" and "Remember", although neither was issued. In July that year they recorded their first releases, "Washington Squabble" and "Please be Kind". Johnson and the West Indian Dance Orchestra, as the band were now known, appeared in an early television broadcast on the BBC in either 1938 or 1939.

Towards the end of 1938 Johnson began making plans for an overseas tour, focused on Scandinavia and the Netherlands; he also planned to attend the 1939 New York World's Fair, appearing in the West Indian section. The outbreak of the Second World War curtailed these plans. In 1939 the band appeared as a backing orchestra for the film Traitor Spy. Johnson did not appear in the film, and his post as band-leader was taken by "Jiver" Hutchinson. In April 1939 the band began a residence at a new club, Willerby's. As well as providing a show for the audience, they played music for dancing. The music magazine Melody Maker considered that the move to music for dancing was advantageous for the band as "their music has a dance-inducing quality which cannot fail to please, while, as an entertaining unit, the band ranks high".

Due to the threat of bombing, Willerby's closed in October 1939, but the band were in demand and began an engagement at the Café de Paris, an upmarket nightclub in Coventry Street, London. The band's popularity rose, as did their profile: the Café de Paris was equipped to broadcast on the BBC, and they regularly performed on radio across the UK. The demand for their employment was aided by British musicians being conscripted for war service, which the largely West Indian orchestra were not.

In 1940 Johnson began a relationship with Gerald Hamilton, a man 20 years his senior; the couple lived for a while in Kinnerton Street, Belgravia. When the Blitz started, they took a cottage in Bray, Berkshire, on the banks of the River Thames, and Johnson would commute into London to perform, returning to Bray to arrive in the early hours of the morning. The location also enabled Johnson to go sailing, one of his hobbies. According to Tom Cullen, Hamilton's biographer, Johnson:

was amused by Gerald's Edwardian airs and malicious anecdotes and considered him to be 'a real cool cat'; while Gerald, for his part, undertook to educate Ken's palate in the mysteries of wine ('I can conceive no greater pleasure than that of instructing a willing pupil in the glories of a worthwhile cellar', as Gerald expresses it).

=== Death ===
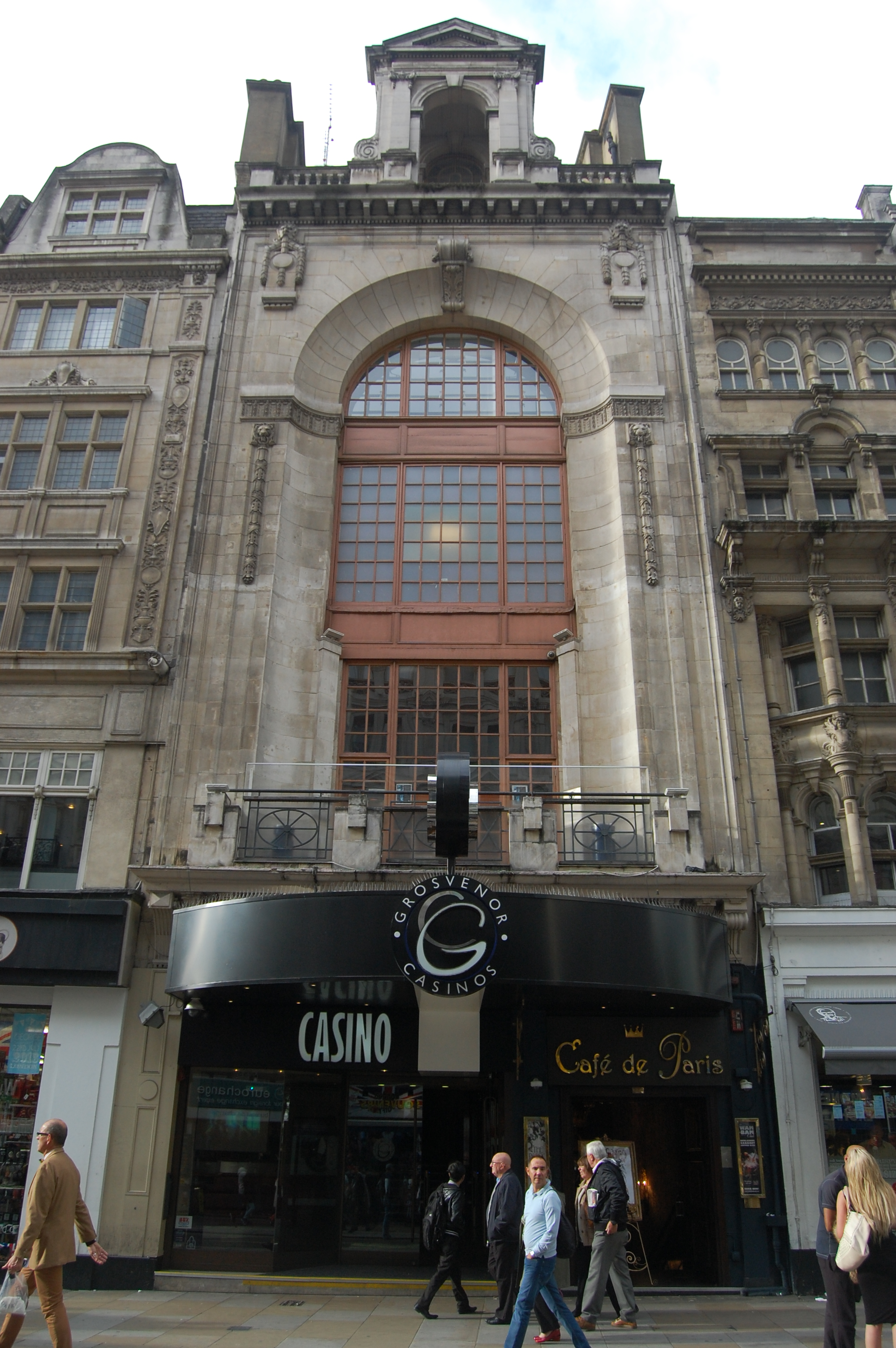
The Café de Paris, London, (2013)

London's West End and clubland continued to party late into the night, despite the nightly raids by German bombers. Clubs prospered as Londoners and visitors revelled for any excuse.

Mad to celebrate this or that—a call-up, a promotion, an unexpected week-end pass, or a hasty marriage—they groped their way through the black-out to the Savoy and the Café de Paris ... and enjoyed the added thrill of dancing the night away while anti-aircraft guns thudded away outside.

The Café de Paris capitalised on the situation. With the club underground, beneath the Rialto cinema, the Café's manager, Martin Poulsen, advertised it as "the safest and gayest restaurant in town—even in air raids. Twenty feet below ground". In reality all that stood between the club and the German bombs were the glass roof of the Rialto and the club's ceiling.

On 8 March 1941 Johnson had drinks with friends at the Embassy Club, near the Café de Paris. It was a night of heavy bombing in central London and his friends tried to persuade him to stay. Johnson was resolved to make his entrance, so ran to the club through the blackout to arrive in time for his 9:45 pm entrance. As the band began playing its signature song, "Oh Johnny", at least one 50-kilogram (110 lb) high-explosive bomb hit the building. At least 34 people died in the club, and dozens were injured. Johnson was killed instantly, as was the saxophonist "Baba" Williams, who was cut in half by the blast; Poulsen was also killed. The band's guitarist Deniz later recounted:

As we started playing there was an awful thud, and all the lights went out. The ceiling fell in and the plaster came pouring down. People were yelling. A stick of bombs went right across Leicester Square, through the Café de Paris and further up to Dean Street. The next thing I remember was being in a small van which had been converted into an ambulance. Then someone came to me and said: "Joe, Ken's dead." It broke me up.

Several other members of the band were also injured in the explosion. Barriteau's wrist was broken; Deniz and [Tommy] Bromley each had a broken leg; de Souza had splinters of glass in his eye, near the pupil. According to the screenwriter Sid Colin, "The West End paused for a moment of horrified silence—then the dance went on". (Note: The Café de Paris was requisitioned as a Nuffield Centre—a recreational institution for servicemen; many new talents had their breaks there, including Peter Sellers, Harry Secombe, Benny Hill, Tommy Cooper, Tony Hancock, Michael Bentine, Frankie Howerd, Spike Milligan and Ronnie Corbett. The Café reopened in 1948 and continued trading until December 2020, when it closed because of bankruptcy brought on by the COVID-19 lockdown.)

The following morning, Hamilton was phoned by the police and asked to go to the Westminster mortuary to identify Johnson. He wrote in his diary "Again that awful feeling of nausea which I had felt when France fell, and again the sensation of the ground slipping from beneath my feet". Hamilton was devastated by the loss of his partner and never travelled without a framed photograph of Johnson in evening dress, always referring to him as "my husband". Johnson's funeral took place on 14 March 1941 at Golders Green Crematorium; his ashes were placed in the Borlase School chapel following a memorial service on 8 March 1942.

Melody Maker published coverage on Johnson and his band for three weeks after his death. The BBC waited until September 1941 to broadcast a memorial to him on the Radio Rhythm Club programme; it drew a 15.3 per cent listenership, which was high for a late-night broadcast on the BBC Forces Programme. Melody Maker arranged a jam session that November at His Master's Voice's Recording Studios, Abbey Road. Many of Johnson's former colleagues played—Deniz and Bromley still showing the leg injuries they sustained—and they played several songs together, with other musicians filling in the gaps in the group. The BBC also broadcast two further programmes in February 1942, once when Perowne played Johnson's records, and once when the band reunited under Barriteau for a one-off performance.

== Impact and legacy ==
The West Indian Dance Orchestra became the leading swing band in Britain, and one of the first British bands to play the style in the manner of the US bands. According to the musicologist Catherine Tackley, by 1941 Johnson and his orchestra were "a unique ensemble in Britain". Wilmer considers the impact they made was "wider and more complex" than just as entertainers. Culturally the orchestra made an impact in society: the apparently all-black outfit was the only one in the country. According to Wilmer:

Johnson's was neither the first black British band nor the first all-black ensemble to appear in Britain. He played some excellent musical arrangements, but as these owed strict allegiance to prevailing American principles and style, his significance in maintaining the first established black British band was social as much as musical.

The historian Peter Fraser wrote that Johnson became both a pioneer and model for later British black musicians. His impact on London clubland, and the social changes brought about from the war, led to the emergence of later racially mixed bands. Within a month of his death, several of his band members had been employed by band-leaders whose band composition had been white until their introduction. Such racial integration in mainstream British jazz and dance orchestras increased over the following years, although many bands, including those led by Hutchinson, still faced what was called the "colour bar" when trying to gain bookings in clubs.

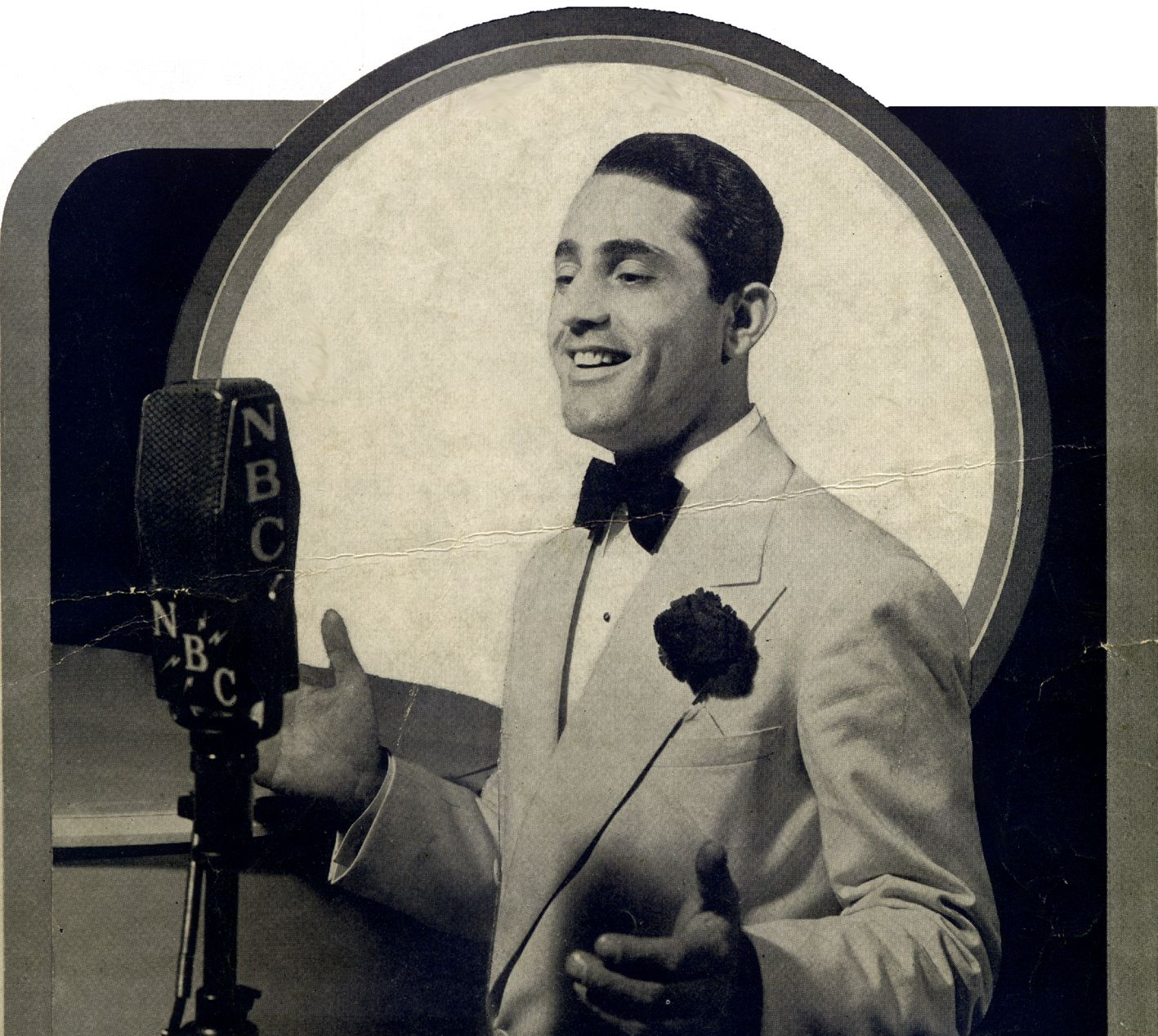
Al Bowlly, the singer who sometimes performed with the band, was killed a month after Johnson.

The band broke up with Johnson's death, devastated and traumatised. Al Bowlly, the singer who sometimes performed with the band, was killed in an air raid the month after Johnson; others moved on to work with other bands: Harry Parry, the Welsh band-leader, hired Deniz, de Souza and Wilkins for his Radio Rhythm Sextet, and Barriteau started a mixed swing orchestra in 1942. Hutchinson worked with the band-leader Geraldo for three years, before he formed another all-black band, the "All-Coloured Orchestra", or "All-Star Coloured Band", that comprised many members of Johnson's group, (Note: This was also billed as "Leslie 'Jiver' Hutchinson's All-Coloured Orchestra".) including Williams, Stephenson, Roberts, Appleton, de Souza, Deniz and Coleridge Goode. The musical historian Roberta Freund Schwartz writes that the movement of "surviving members ... arguably improved the overall sound of native jazz".

In 2013 the BBC screened Dancing on the Edge by Stephen Poliakoff. The series centred on a fictional jazz band in the early 1930s, led by Louis Lester (played by Chiwetel Ejiofor). The character was a composite of several band-leaders of the time, including Johnson. The same year the broadcaster Clemency Burton-Hill presented Swinging in the Blitz for the BBC, an exploration of the role of jazz in Britain during the Second World War; Johnson and his band's history was the focus for much of the programme. In 2019 the actor and writer Clarke Peters presented the BBC Radio 4 series Black Music in Europe: A Hidden History; the episode covering the Second World War included a history of Johnson and his band.

== Approach and style ==
Johnson was tall, elegant and handsome. His image to the public is described by the social historian Stephen Bourne as "a gentleman about town". Both he and his all-black band dressed in white jackets—Johnson would wear white tails and conduct the orchestra using an extra-long baton. His band wore white dinner jackets and, according to Wilmer, "For the general public, the sight of twelve disciplined men of African descent, dressed smartly in white band jackets, was exciting and memorable." One of Johnson's aims was to ensure the band had a strong visual impact, just as the American swing bands did. This included choreographing the movements of the musicians, as well as incorporating his own dance moves into the music. According to the writer Amon Saba Saakana, Johnson's "brilliant dancing and showmanship established the band's reputation as one of the best in Britain".

Although Johnson was not as musically talented as the musicians he led—one of his former colleagues said of him "he couldn't tell a B flat from a pig's foot!"—he had, as his business manager said, "the gift of imparting his terrific enthusiasm to those who were [talented]".

Introducing a black musician into a largely or all-white group was difficult, and several London venues blocked the inclusion of a black musician. Those clubs and band-leaders that did include black musicians would use one—often seen as a novelty for a band—but struggle to include a second against a club manager's veto unless the musician was better than a white musician. When Johnson discussed the problem with Bert Firman, who preceded him at the Café de Paris, Johnson related he had also faced the obstruction:

So what real chance has your ordinary, competent but day-to-day coloured musician got unless, of course, he is American? There is such an inferiority complex about Americans that a lousy musician would still get by so long as he had a Yank accent ... But I'm talking about West Indians. What real chance does a West Indian got? Not much. Put us in a group, stress that we are a West Indian Dance Orchestra and then we become a big novelty. Those clever fellows with their natural rhythms. Just make sure everyone gets the point, call me Ken Snakehips Johnson!

== Professional output ==
=== Recordings ===
Johnson's first band—the Aristocrats (or Emperors) of Jazz—did not make any recordings. The discs produced by the West Indian Dance Orchestra were commercial issues for listeners of dance band music, not swing. Because the 78 record had a 3 minute 20 second limit on the recording, "the band's special sense of swing was sometimes dampened", according to Simons. Nevertheless, initially recording for Decca Records, their work was promoted by the company in their "Swing" series.

Some of the arrangements of Johnson's music were done by the American musician Adrian de Haas, others by Barriteau and some by Kenny Baker—who later appeared in Ted Heath's orchestra. The jazz musician Soweto Kinch considers Johnson's recordings contain aspects of Calypso music. The musical historian Jason Toynbee considers the music an authentic swing, with sophisticated arrangement "but still very much American in its derivation". For some of the recordings, Johnson employed his friend, Al Bowlly—who also accompanied the band at the Café de Paris—and the Henderson Twins on vocals. One of the recordings, "Exactly Like You", features the whole band singing in syncopated vocal.

Recordings by Johnson
| Title | Date of recording | Label and catalogue number | Notes | Ref. |
|---|---|---|---|---|
| "Goodbye" | 4 February 1938 | – | Unissued | |
| "Remember" | 4 February 1938 | – | Unissued | |
| "Washington Squabble" | 17 July 1938 | – | Unissued | |
| "Please Be Kind" | 17 July 1938 | – | Unissued | |
| "Exactly Like You" | 22 September 1938 | Decca F6854 | The name "Snakehips" is omitted from the artist credits | |
| "The Sheik of Araby" | 22 September 1938 | Decca F6958 | The name "Snakehips" is omitted from the artist credits | |
| "My Buddy" | 22 September 1938 | – | The name "Snakehips" is omitted from the artist credits | |
| "Snakehips Swing" | 22 September 1938 | Decca F6854 | The name "Snakehips" is omitted from the artist credits | |
| "I'm in Love for the Last Time" | 29 January 1940 | His Master's Voice BD5559 | Included on the collection "The Great British Dance Bands Play the Music of Hugh Charles 1938–1945" | |
| "Seventeen Candles" | 29 January 1940 | His Master's Voice BD5559 | | |
| "Give Me My Ranch" | 29 January 1940 | His Master's Voice BD5560 | | |
| "Goodnight My Beautiful" | 29 January 1940 | His Master's Voice BD5560 | | |
| "Tuxedo Junction" | 27 February 1940 | His Master's Voice BD5576 | | |
| "Ida" | 27 February 1940 | – | | |
| "A Small Café by Notre Dame" | 27 February 1940 | His Master's Voice BD5568 | | |
| "Careless" | 27 February 1940 | His Master's Voice BD5568 | | |
| "Sing a Round Up Song (Yippy-I-Ay)" | 24 April 1940 | His Master's Voice BD5593 | | |
| "It's a Blue World" | 24 April 1940 | His Master's Voice BD5593 | | |
| "Blow, Blow Thou Winter Wind" | 24 April 1940 | His Master's Voice BD5592 | Includes Al Bowlly and the Henderson Twins on vocals | |
| "It Was a Lover and His Lass" | 24 April 1940 | – | Includes Al Bowlly and the Henderson Twins on vocals | |

=== Broadcasts ===
Johnson both appeared with his band on BBC Radio and acted as a disc jockey, presenting programmes such as Calypso and other West Indian Music; the broadcast he made on 24 June 1939 preceded the cricket Test match between the West Indies and the MCC. Although the BBC eschewed jazz and ensured their modern music output was more conventional dance music, Johnson played swing, advertising the programme as "ultra-modern dance music". Johnson had recordings made of his radio broadcasts onto acetate discs, giving some of these to the band members. Some of these recordings are now held by the British Library Sound Archive.

Radio broadcasts by Johnson
| Broadcast | Date | Channel | Notes | Ref. |
|---|---|---|---|---|
| Ken 'Snake-hips' Johnson and his West Indian Orchestra | 11 January 1938 | BBC Regional Programme, London | 30-minute broadcast | |
| Ken Snakehips Johnson and his West Indian Orchestra | 7 February 1938 | BBC Regional Programme, London | 30-minute broadcast | |
| Ken Snakehips Johnson and his West Indian Orchestra | 7 April 1938 | BBC National Programme | 35-minute broadcast | |
| Ken Johnson and his West Indian Orchestra | 15 July 1938 | BBC Regional Programme, London | 40-minute broadcast | |
| Ken Johnson and his West Indian Dance Orchestra | 19 September 1938 | BBC National Programme | 40-minute broadcast | |
| Ken Johnson and his West Indian Dance Orchestra | 7 October 1938 | BBC National Programme | 40-minute broadcast | |
| Ken Johnson and his West Indian Dance Orchestra | 3 November 1938 | BBC National Programme | 30-minute broadcast | |
| Ken Johnson and his West Indian Dance Orchestra | 13 December 1938 | BBC Regional Programme, London | 30-minute broadcast | |
| Theatres of Variety | 16 December 1938 | BBC Regional Programme, London | Variety programme broadcast from the Bristol Hippodrome. Johnson and the band were one of the acts featured. | |
| Ken Johnson and his West Indian Dance Orchestra | 20 April 1939 | BBC Regional Programme, London | 30-minute broadcast | |
| Calypso | 24 June 1939 | BBC Regional Programme, London | 30-minute programme; Johnson playing records of West Indian music | |
| 'Cotton Club Parade', 1931–39 | 1 July 1939 | BBC Regional Programme, London | 30-minute broadcast in which Johnson and his band feature | |
| Ken Johnson and his West Indian Dance Orchestra | 28 July 1939 | BBC National Programme | 45-minute broadcast | |
| Ken Johnson and his West Indian Dance Orchestra | 29 November 1939 | BBC Home Service Basic | 40-minute broadcast from the Café de Paris | |
| Dance Cabaret | 19 December 1939 | BBC Home Service Basic | 45-minute broadcast from the Café de Paris; Johnson and his band feature, among others | |
| Dear Old Southland | 1 March 1940 | BBC Forces Programme | 45-minute broadcast | |
| Dear Old Southland | 17 March 1940 | BBC Forces Programme | 50-minute broadcast | |
| Ken Johnson and his West Indian Dance Orchestra | 28 March 1940 | BBC Home Service Basic | 30-minute broadcast from the Café de Paris | |
| Dear Old Southland | 6 April 1940 | BBC Forces Programme | 45-minute broadcast | |
| An Excerpt from 'Jazz Jamboree, 1940' | 7 April 1940 | BBC Forces Programme | 55-minute broadcast; Johnson's was one of several bands performing | |
| Ken Johnson and his West Indian Dance Orchestra | 12 April 1940 | BBC Forces Programme | 1-hour broadcast from the Café de Paris | |
| Ken Johnson and his West Indian Dance Orchestra | 18 April 1940 | BBC Forces Programme | 30-minute broadcast from the Café de Paris | |
| Ken Johnson and his West Indian Dance Orchestra | 7 May 1940 | BBC Home Service Basic | 45-minute broadcast from the Café de Paris | |
| Dear Old Southland | 20 May 1940 | BBC Forces Programme | 45-minute broadcast | |
| London Dances | 3 June 1940 | BBC Home Service Basic | 30-minute broadcast from the Café de Paris | |
| Ken Johnson and his West Indian Dance Orchestra | 4 June 1940 | BBC Forces Programme | 30-minute broadcast | |
| Dear Old Southland | 23 June 1940 | BBC Forces Programme | 30-minute broadcast | |
| Ken Johnson and his West Indian Dance Orchestra | 2 July 1940 | BBC Forces Programme | 30-minute broadcast | |
| The Name on the Label | 13 July 1940 | BBC Forces Programme | 25-minute interview of Johnson by Leslie Perowne of the BBC's Variety Department | |
| Ken Johnson and his West Indian Dance Orchestra | 21 July 1940 | BBC Forces Programme | 30-minute broadcast | |
| Ken Johnson and his West Indian Dance Orchestra | 10 September 1940 | BBC Home Service Basic | 50-minute broadcast | |
| Dear Old Southland | 14 September 1940 | BBC Forces Programme | 40-minute broadcast | |
| Ken Johnson and his West Indian Dance Orchestra | 3 October 1940 | BBC Forces Programme | 30-minute broadcast | |
| Calling the West Indies | 10 October 1940 | BBC Empire Service | Johnson interviewed by Una Marson | |
| Ken Johnson and his West Indian Dance Orchestra | 15 October 1940 | BBC Forces Programme | 45-minute broadcast | |
| Dear Old Southland | 26 October 1940 | BBC Forces Programme | 30-minute broadcast | |
| The Sunday-Nighters | 10 November 1940 | BBC Forces Programme | 40-minute broadcast including Stanley Holloway and Vera Lynn | |
| Ken Johnson and his West Indian Dance Orchestra | 2 December 1940 | BBC Forces Programme | 30-minute broadcast | |
| Dear Old Southland | 12 December 1940 | BBC Forces Programme | 45-minute broadcast | |
| Ken Johnson and his West Indian Dance Orchestra | 28 December 1940 | BBC Home Service Basic | 30-minute broadcast | |
| Ken Johnson and his West Indian Dance Orchestra | 3 January 1941 | BBC Forces Programme | 40-minute broadcast | |
| Ken Johnson and his West Indian Dance Orchestra | 11 January 1941 | BBC Forces Programme | 40-minute broadcast | |
| Sunday Matinee | 9 February 1941 | BBC Forces Programme | 35-minute broadcast | |
| Ken Johnson and his West Indian Dance Orchestra | 18 February 1941 | BBC Home Service Basic | 40-minute broadcast | |
| Dear Old Southland | 5 March 1941 | BBC Forces Programme | 50-minute broadcast | |
| Dear Old Southland | 14 March 1941 | BBC Forces Programme | 45-minute broadcast | |
| Radio Rhythm Club | 3 September 1941 | BBC Forces Programme | 30-minute broadcast in memory of Johnson, hosted by Leslie Perowne, the BBC's Head of Music | |

== Notes and references ==
=== Sources ===
==== Books ====
- Baade, Christina L. (2012). Victory Through Harmony: The BBC and Popular Music in World War II. Oxford: Oxford University Press. ISBN 978-0-1993-2805-5.
- Bourne, Stephen (2013). Mother Country: Britain's Black Community on the Home Front, 1939–45. Stroud, Glos: The History Press. ISBN 978-0-7524-9681-8.
- Bourne, Stephen (2016). Brief Encounters: Lesbians and Gays in British Cinema, 1930-1977. London: Bloomsbury Publishing. ISBN 978-1-4742-9133-0.
- Bourne, Stephen (2019). Fighting Proud: The Untold Story of the Gay Men Who Served in Two World Wars. London: Bloomsbury Academic. ISBN 978-1-3501-4322-7.
- Bourne, Stephen (2020). Under Fire: Black Britain in Wartime 1939–45. Cheltenham, Gloucestershire: The History Press. ISBN 978-0-7509-9583-2.
- Cambridge, Vibert C. (2015). Musical Life in Guyana. Jackson, MS: University Press of Mississippi. ISBN 978-1-6284-6011-7.
- Carey, Dave; McCarthy, Albert J. (1955). Jazz Directory 5: The Directory of Recorded Jazz and Swing Music. (J-Kirk). London: Cassell & Co. OCLC 929278570.
- Colin, Sid (1980). And the Bands Played On. London: Elm Tree Books. ISBN 978-0-241-10448-4.
- Cowley, John (1990). "London is the Place: Caribbean Music in the Context of Empire 1900–60". In Oliver, Paul (ed.). Black Music in Britain: Essays on the Afro Asian Contribution to Popular Music. Milton Keynes, Bucks: Open University Press. pp. 57–76. ISBN 978-0-3351-5297-1.
- Crawford, Richard (1992). Jazz Standards on Record, 1900–1942: A Core Repertory. Chicago, IL: Center for Black Music Research. ISBN 978-0-9299-1103-8.
- Cullen, Tom (2014). The Man Who Was Norris: The Life of Gerald Hamilton (Kindle ed.). New York: Dedalus. ISBN 978-1-9102-1300-1.
- Fraser, Peter (2007). "Johnson, Ken 'Snakehips'". In Dabydeen, David; Gilmore, John; Jones, Cecily (eds.). The Oxford Companion to Black British History. Oxford: Oxford University Press. p. 240. ISBN 978-0-1928-0439-6.
- Gibbs, Craig Martin (2015). Calypso and Other Music of Trinidad, 1912–1962: An Annotated Discography. Jefferson, NC: McFarland. ISBN 978-0-7864-7851-4.
- Graves, Charles (1958). Champagne and Chandeliers: The Story of the Café de Paris. London: Odhams Press. OCLC 560141610.
- Matera, Marc (2015). Black London: The Imperial Metropolis and Decolonization in the Twentieth Century. Oakland, CA: University of California Press. ISBN 978-0-520-28429-6.
- Rust, Brian (1978). Jazz Records, 1897–1942. Volume 1: Irving Aaronson to Abe Lyman (4th ed.). New Rochelle, NY: Arlington House Publishers. ISBN 978-0-8700-0404-9.
- Rust, Brian; Forbes, Sandy (1987). British Dance Bands on Record; 1911 to 1945. Harrow, Middlesex: General Gramophone Publications Ltd. ISBN 978-0-9024-7015-6.
- Schwartz, Roberta Freund (2007). How Britain got the Blues: The Transmission and Reception of American Blues Style in the United Kingdom. Aldershot, Hampshire: Ashgate Publishing. ISBN 978-0-7546-5580-0.
- Simons, Andrew (2001). "Black British Swing: The African diaspora's contribution to England's own jazz of the 1930s and 1940s". In Linehan, Andy (ed.). Aural History: Essays on Recorded Sound. London: British Library. pp. 117–138. ISBN 978-0-7123-4741-9.
- Tackley, Catherine (2013). "Jazz, Dance and Black British Identities". Bodies of Sound: Studies Across Popular Music and Dance. Farnham, Surrey: Ashgate Publishing. pp. 193–207. ISBN 978-1-4094-4517-3.
- Tackley, Catherine (2014). "Race, Identity and the Meaning of Jazz in 1940s Britain". In Stratton, Jon; Zuberi, Nabeel (eds.). Black Popular Music in Britain Since 1945. Farnham, Surrey: Ashgate Publishing. pp. 11–27. ISBN 978-1-4094-6914-8.
- Thompson, Leslie; Green, Jeffrey (2009). Swing From a Small Island: The Story of Leslie Thompson. London: Northway Publications. ISBN 978-0-9557-8882-6.
- Towler, Edward (1987). British Dance Bands (1920–1949) on 12-Inch Long-Playing Records: Supplement to Original Edition (Releases from 1985 to 1987). Harrow, Middlesex: General Gramophone Publications. OCLC 754438962.

==== Journals and magazines ====
- Bayly, Ernie (1977). "The Great British Dance Bands". The Talking Machine Review (49A): 1137.
- "Calypso". The Radio Times. No. 820. 16 June 1939. p. 78. ISSN 0033-8060. Archived from the original on 6 June 2021.
- "'Cotton Club Parade', 1931–39". The Radio Times. No. 821. 13 June 1939. p. 74. ISSN 0033-8060. Archived from the original on 21 October 2014.
- Cowley, John (1985). "Cultural 'Fusions': Aspects of British West Indian Music in the USA and Britain 1918–51". Popular Music. 5: 81–96. doi:10.1017/S0261143000001938. JSTOR 853284. S2CID 162966761.
- Cowley, John; Green, Jeffrey; Rye, Howard (20 January 2002). "Johnson, Ken "Snake Hips"". Grove Music Online (8th ed.). Oxford University Press. doi:10.1093/gmo/9781561592630.article.J232900. ISBN 978-1-56159-263-0. (subscription, Wikilibrary access, or UK public library membership required)
- "Dance Cabaret". The Radio Times. No. 846. 15 December 1939. p. 21. ISSN 0033-8060. Archived from the original on 6 June 2021.
- "Dear Old Southland". The Radio Times. No. 856. 23 February 1940. p. 34. ISSN 0033-8060. Archived from the original on 11 September 2024.
- "Dear Old Southland". The Radio Times. No. 859. 15 March 1940. p. 12. ISSN 0033-8060. Archived from the original on 11 September 2024.
- "Dear Old Southland". The Radio Times. No. 861. 29 March 1940. p. 42. ISSN 0033-8060. Archived from the original on 11 September 2024.
- "Dear Old Southland". The Radio Times. No. 868. 17 May 1940. p. 14. ISSN 0033-8060. Archived from the original on 11 September 2024.
- "Dear Old Southland". The Radio Times. No. 873. 21 June 1940. p. 7. ISSN 0033-8060. Archived from the original on 6 June 2021.
- "Dear Old Southland". The Radio Times. No. 884. 6 September 1940. p. 24. ISSN 0033-8060. Archived from the original on 6 June 2021.
- "Dear Old Southland". The Radio Times. No. 890. 18 October 1940. p. 26. ISSN 0033-8060. Archived from the original on 11 September 2024.
- "Dear Old Southland". The Radio Times. No. 897. 6 December 1940. p. 22. ISSN 0033-8060. Archived from the original on 6 June 2021.
- "Dear Old Southland". The Radio Times. No. 909. 28 February 1941. p. 19. ISSN 0033-8060. Archived from the original on 11 September 2024.
- "Dear Old Southland". The Radio Times. No. 910. 7 March 1941. p. 21. ISSN 0033-8060. Archived from the original on 11 September 2024.
- "An Excerpt from 'Jazz Jamboree, 1940'". The Radio Times. No. 862. 5 April 1940. p. 16. ISSN 0033-8060. Archived from the original on 11 September 2024.
- "Johnson's Resident Break". Melody Maker. 26 December 1936. p. 8.
- "Ken Johnson and his West Indian Orchestra". The Radio Times. No. 771. 8 July 1938. p. 62. ISSN 0033-8060. Archived from the original on 6 June 2021.
- "Ken Johnson and his West Indian Dance Orchestra". The Radio Times. No. 781. 16 September 1938. p. 28. ISSN 0033-8060. Archived from the original on 11 September 2024.
- "Ken Johnson and his West Indian Dance Orchestra". The Radio Times. No. 783. 30 September 1938. p. 66. ISSN 0033-8060. Archived from the original on 6 June 2021.
- "Ken Johnson and his West Indian Dance Orchestra". The Radio Times. No. 787. 28 October 1938. p. 60. ISSN 0033-8060. Archived from the original on 6 June 2021.
- "Ken Johnson and his West Indian Dance Orchestra". The Radio Times. No. 793. 9 December 1938. p. 44. ISSN 0033-8060. Archived from the original on 11 September 2024.
- "Ken Snakehips Johnson and his West Indian Orchestra". The Radio Times. No. 749. 4 February 1938. p. 35. ISSN 0033-8060. Archived from the original on 6 June 2021.
- "Ken Snakehips Johnson and his West Indian Orchestra". The Radio Times. No. 757. 1 April 1938. p. 54. ISSN 0033-8060. Archived from the original on 6 June 2021.
- "Ken Johnson and his West Indian Dance Orchestra". The Radio Times. No. 811. 14 April 1939. p. 58. ISSN 0033-8060. Archived from the original on 11 September 2024.
- "Ken Johnson and his West Indian Dance Orchestra". The Radio Times. No. 825. 21 July 1939. p. 62. ISSN 0033-8060. Archived from the original on 11 September 2024.
- "Ken Johnson and his West Indian Dance Orchestra". The Radio Times. No. 843. 24 November 1939. p. 25. ISSN 0033-8060. Archived from the original on 11 September 2024.
- "Ken Johnson and his West Indian Dance Orchestra". The Radio Times. No. 860. 22 March 1940. p. 34. ISSN 0033-8060. Archived from the original on 11 September 2024.
- "Ken Johnson and his West Indian Dance Orchestra". The Radio Times. No. 862. 5 April 1940. p. 36. ISSN 0033-8060. Archived from the original on 6 June 2021.
- "Ken Johnson and his West Indian Dance Orchestra". The Radio Times. No. 863. 12 April 1940. p. 32. ISSN 0033-8060. Archived from the original on 11 September 2024.
- "Ken Johnson and his West Indian Dance Orchestra". The Radio Times. No. 866. 3 May 1940. p. 24. ISSN 0033-8060. Archived from the original on 6 June 2021.
- "Ken Johnson and His West Indian Dance Orchestra". The Radio Times. No. 870. 31 May 1940. p. 18. ISSN 0033-8060. Archived from the original on 11 September 2024.
- "Ken Johnson and his West Indian Dance Orchestra". The Radio Times. No. 874. 28 June 1940. p. 15. ISSN 0033-8060. Archived from the original on 11 September 2024.
- "Ken Johnson and his West Indian Dance Orchestra". The Radio Times. No. 877. 19 July 1940. p. 6. ISSN 0033-8060. Archived from the original on 6 June 2021.
- "Ken Johnson and his West Indian Dance Orchestra". The Radio Times. No. 884. 6 September 1940. p. 14. ISSN 0033-8060. Archived from the original on 11 September 2024.
- "Ken Johnson and his West Indian Dance Orchestra". The Radio Times. No. 887. 27 September 1940. p. 18. ISSN 0033-8060. Archived from the original on 11 September 2024.
- "Ken Johnson and his West Indian Dance Orchestra". The Radio Times. No. 889. 11 October 1940. p. 14. ISSN 0033-8060. Archived from the original on 11 September 2024.
- "Ken Johnson and his West Indian Dance Orchestra". The Radio Times. No. 896. 29 November 1940. p. 9. ISSN 0033-8060. Archived from the original on 11 September 2024.
- "Ken Johnson and his West Indian Dance Orchestra". The Radio Times. No. 899. 22 December 1940. p. 30. ISSN 0033-8060. Archived from the original on 11 September 2024.
- "Ken Johnson and his West Indian Dance Orchestra". The Radio Times. No. 900. 27 December 1940. p. 21. ISSN 0033-8060. Archived from the original on 6 June 2021.
- "Ken Johnson and his West Indian Dance Orchestra". The Radio Times. No. 901. 3 January 1941. p. 24. ISSN 0033-8060. Archived from the original on 6 June 2021.
- "Ken Johnson and his West Indian Dance Orchestra". The Radio Times. No. 907. 14 February 1941. p. 16. ISSN 0033-8060. Archived from the original on 6 June 2021.
- "Ken 'Snake-Hips' Johnson and his West Indian Dance Orchestra". The Radio Times. No. 745. 7 January 1938. p. 36. ISSN 0033-8060. Archived from the original on 6 June 2021.
- "London Dances". The Radio Times. No. 870. 31 May 1940. p. 15. ISSN 0033-8060. Archived from the original on 6 June 2021.
- "The Name on the Label". The Radio Times. No. 875. 5 July 1940. p. 27. ISSN 0033-8060. Archived from the original on 6 June 2021.
- Powell, Peter (May 2013). "Jamming the Blitz: The 1941 HMV session". Jazz Journal. 29 (2): 14–15.
- "Radio Rhythm Club". The Radio Times. No. 935. 29 August 1941. p. 17. ISSN 0033-8060.
- Saakana, Amon Saba (1995). "Culture, Concept, Aesthetics: The Phenomenon of the African Musical Universe in Western Musical Culture". African American Review. 29 (2): 329–340. doi:10.2307/3042312. JSTOR 3042312.
- "Sunday Matinee". The Radio Times. No. 906. 7 February 1941. p. 7. ISSN 0033-8060. Archived from the original on 6 June 2021.
- "The Sunday-Nighters". The Radio Times. No. 893. 8 November 1940. p. 6. ISSN 0033-8060. Archived from the original on 6 June 2021.
- "Theatres of Variety". The Radio Times. No. 793. 9 December 1938. p. 76. ISSN 0033-8060. Archived from the original on 6 June 2021.
- Toynbee, Jason (2013). "Race, History and Black British Jazz". Black Music Research Journal. 33 (1): 1–25. doi:10.5406/blacmusiresej.33.1.0001. S2CID 191433299.
- Wilmer, Val (2006a). "Johnson, Kenrick Reginald Hijmans [Ken] [called Ken Snakehips Johnson] (1914–1941)". Oxford Dictionary of National Biography (online ed.). Oxford University Press. doi:10.1093/ref:odnb/74576. (Subscription, Wikipedia Library access or UK public library membership required.)
- Wilmer, Val (2006b). "Hutchinson, Leslie George [known as Leslie Jiver Hutchinson] (1906–1959)". Oxford Dictionary of National Biography (online ed.). Oxford University Press. doi:10.1093/ref:odnb/74816. (Subscription, Wikipedia Library access or UK public library membership required.)

==== News ====
- Burton-Hill, Clemency (16 February 2013). "All that jazz: Swinging in the Blitz". The Independent. p. 19.
- Fordham, John (4 February 2013). "Dancing on the Edge: what was life really like for black jazz bands in 1930s Britain?". The Guardian.
- Horton, Helena (23 December 2020). "Legendary cabaret club that beat the Blitz says show's over". The Daily Telegraph. p. 3.
- "Mary Cook". The Daily Telegraph. 2 May 2006.
- "The Profession Mourns". Melody Maker. 15 March 1941. p. 1.
- Wilmer, Val (24 February 1991). "First Sultan of Swing". The Independent on Sunday. p. 10.

==== Websites ====
- "Black British Jazz: From 'Snakehips' Johnson to the Jazz Warriors". National Youth Jazz Orchestra. 29 October 2020. Archived from the original on 6 May 2021.
- "Black Music in Europe: A Hidden History – Series 2 – 1939–45". BBC. Archived from the original on 11 September 2024.
- Clark, Gregory (2020). "The Annual RPI and Average Earnings for Britain, 1209 to Present (New Series)". MeasuringWorth. Archived from the original on 1 April 2023.
- Hendy, David. "Caribbean Voices". BBC. Archived from the original on 14 June 2020.
- Janes, Andrew (8 March 2013). "The bombing of the Café de Paris". The National Archives. Archived from the original on 11 September 2024.
- Richards, Martin (July 2002). "From the archive: Black British Swing". Jazz Journal. Archived from the original on 11 September 2024.
- "Swinging into the Blitz: A Culture Show Special". BBC. Archived from the original on 11 September 2024.
- "Traitor Spy". Library of Congress. Archived from the original on 6 June 2021.
- "Traitor Spy (1940)". British Film Institute. Archived from the original on 14 December 2017.

==== Television ====
- Swinging with the Blitz (Television production). BBC Scotland. 15 February 2013.
