= Bert King =

Bert King may refer to:

- Bert King (Home and Away), a character on Home and Away
- Bert King (rugby league), New Zealand rugby league international

== See also ==
- Albert King (disambiguation)
- Robert King (disambiguation)
- Bertie King, musician
- Herbert King, actor
