= Geoffrey Green (disambiguation) =

Geoffrey Green (1911–1990) was a British football writer.

Geoffrey Green may also refer to:

- Geoffrey Green (politician) (1901–1959), Australian politician

== See also ==
- Jeffrey Green (historian) (born 1944), British historian and writer
- Jeff Green (disambiguation)
