= Jeff Green =

Jeff or Jeffrey Green may refer to:

== Entertainment ==
- Jeff Green (multimedia artist) (born 1956), Canadian radio, television, and multimedia producer and director
- Jeff Green (writer) (born 1961), American writer and video game journalist
- Jeff Green (comedian) (born 1964), English comedian and writer

== Politics ==
- Jeff Green (Kentucky politician) (1954–1997), member of the Kentucky Senate
- Jeff Green (British politician) (born 1957), Conservative politician and former leader of Wirral Council

== Sports ==
- Jeff Green (racing driver) (born 1962), American stock car racing driver
- Jeff Green (basketball) (born 1986), American basketball player

== Other ==
- Jeff Green (businessman) (born 1977), American businessman, co-founder of Trade Desk Inc
- Jeffrey Green (historian) (born 1944), British historian

== See also ==
- Jeff Greene (born 1954), American real estate entrepreneur
- Jeff Greene (character), fictional character from Curb Your Enthusiasm
- Geoffrey Green (disambiguation)
