= Frank Dove =

English boxer (1897–1957)

Frank Dove MM
- Born: Francis Sydney Dove; 3 September 1897; London, England
- Died: 12 February 1957 (aged 59); Wolverhampton, England
- Known for: Olympic boxer
- Spouse: Ameila Ethel Ellis Dove (m. 1919)
- Children: 2
- Relatives: Frans Dove (father); Evelyn Dove; Mabel Dove Danquah (sisters)

Francis Sydney Dove MM (3 September 1897 – 10 February 1957) was a British boxer who competed in the 1920 Summer Olympics in Antwerp, Belgium. In 1920, he was eliminated in the quarter-finals of the heavyweight class after losing his fight to the upcoming silver medallist Søren Petersen. After the outbreak of World War I, Dove joined the British Army and won the Military Medal for bravery during the Battle of Cambrai (1917).

== Biography ==
Frank Dove was born in Holborn, England, on 3 September 1897; his father, an Oxford University-educated barrister, was from Sierra Leone while his mother was English. His younger sister was singer and actress Evelyn Dove.

In 1910, he was sent to Cranleigh School, where he was one of the school's first black pupils. A successful sportsman there, he was in the 1st XI for football and cricket and was Hon. Secretary of both sports. He was also one of the two gymnasts who represented Cranleigh at the Public Schools Gymnastic Competition at Aldershot – at the time a major event that Cranleigh had won five times, most recently in 1913 – where the school finished third overall. The school magazine said he was "a versatile member of the community both academically and athletically".

He left in July 1915 and went on to Merton College, Oxford, where he was reading law in November 1916 when, aged 19, he was called up for service and enlisted in the British Army, giving his home address as Brighton. He joined the Royal Tank Corps in "E" battalion, where initially he served as a dispatch rider (under Second Lieutenant Johnson), and subsequently fought at the Battle of Cambrai in 1917, winning the Military Medal for his bravery at the Battle of Cambrai in November 1917. In June 1918, aged 20, Dove joined the Cadet Unit of the RAF.

After being demobbed in 1920, he returned to Oxford. While there, he boxed for the university and also for Great Britain at the 1920 Antwerp Olympics. He continued to box while practising as a barrister and was still winning ABA divisional cruiser-weight championships in 1945, by which time he was 48.

He died at the Royal Hospital in Wolverhampton on 12 February 1957, two days after being involved in a traffic accident in Weston-under-Lizard when his car hit a tree. His story featured in Stephen Bourne's book Black Poppies: Britain's Black Community and the Great War, which was published in 2014.
