= Elaine Delmar =

British singer (born 1939)

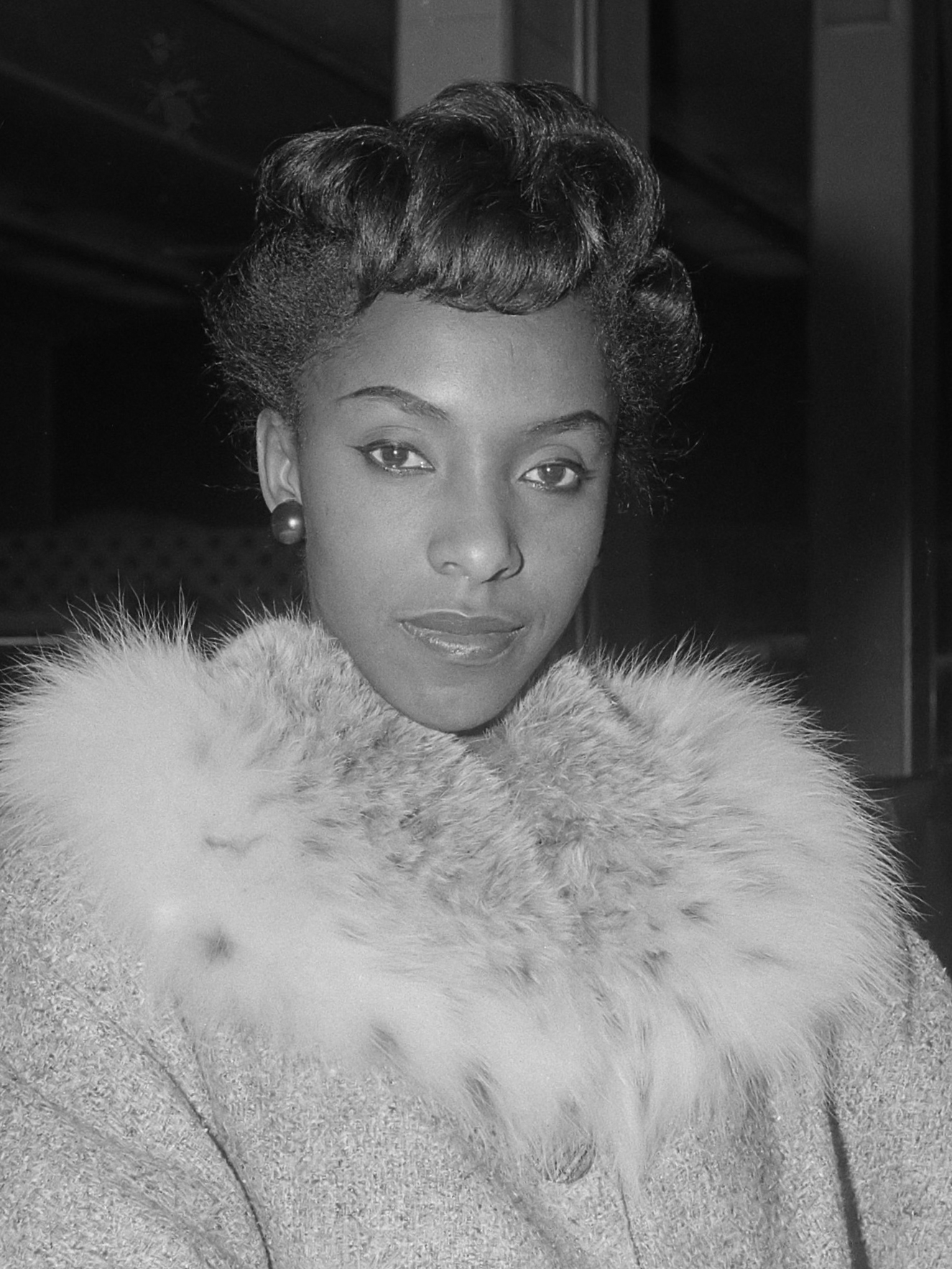
- Delmar in 1962
- Born: 13 September 1939 (age 87); Harpenden, Hertfordshire, England

Elaine Delmar (born Elaine Pamela Hutchinson; 13 September 1939) is a British singer and actress, whose career has encompassed stage acting, music recording and concert performances. Born in Harpenden, she is the daughter of Jamaican jazz trumpeter Leslie "Jiver" Hutchinson. After learning the piano as a child, Delmar became a singer and toured with her father's band from the age of sixteen.

In 1952, she appeared in Finian's Rainbow in Liverpool. She sang with Coleridge Goode's group The Dominoes for a month in Germany in the mid-1950s, before going solo. Delmar also appeared in the Ken Russell film Mahler (1974).

== Early life ==
Elaine Delmar was born on 13 September 1939 in Harpenden, Hertfordshire. Her parents were father Jiver Hutchinson, a jazz trumpeter born in Jamaica, and mother Phyllis, both of whom moved to the UK in the 1930s. She spent her childhood with her younger brother and sister living in North London, where she attended the Trinity Grammar School in Wood Green (now known as Woodside High School). Delmar began learning the piano when she was six, going on to play the instrument on the radio during the BBC's Children's Hour when she was thirteen. She began touring with her father at the age of sixteen, singing with his band at performances in venues such as US Air Force bases. Delmar was on tour with him when he was killed in a road accident in 1959.

== Career ==
=== Singer ===
Delmar's professional singing career began in the mid-1950s when she was selected by bassist Coleridge Goode and Lauderic Caton to sing with their quartet, The Dominoes. She spent a month with them at the Club Ecstase in Bad Harzburg, Germany. Goode later said in his autobiography that "I think it's fair to say that we started off her career". Delmar left the Dominoes after her spell with them in Germany and launched a solo career, including playing at clubs and carrying out overseas tours.

In 2010, she featured in concert with Wynton Marsalis's Lincoln Center Jazz Orchestra.

=== Acting ===
Delmar made her first stage appearance in the late 1950s when she was cast in the play Finian's Rainbow in a revival production in Liverpool. She then joined the cast of the Richard Rodgers musical drama No Strings in London's West End, as an understudy for Beverly Todd. In 1972 she was part of the original London cast of the musical Cowardy Custard at the Mermaid Theatre, which was based on the songs of Noël Coward. In 1977 she took on her biggest stage position, a starring role in Bubbling Brown Sugar, and then went on to appear in both the London and Broadway versions of Jerome Kern in Hollywood. Another role, in which she was cast purely as an actress, was A Map Of The World at the Royal National Theatre. She was also cast as the Bohemian Princess in the Ken Russell film Mahler.

== Personal life ==
As of 2009, Delmar was living in the north London suburb of Hadley Wood.

== Discography ==
- A Swinging Chick
- But Beautiful
- Elaine Delmar and Friends
- Nobody Else But Me
- S'Wonderful

== Theatre appearances ==
- Finian's Rainbow (1952/1953)
- No Strings (1961)... at Her Majesty's Theatre
- Cowardy Custard (1972)... at the Mermaid Theatre
- Bubbling Brown Sugar (1977)... at the Royalty Theatre
- Map of the World... at the Royal National Theatre
- Jerome Kern in Hollywood... in London and New York
