= Mabel Dove Danquah =

Ghanaian journalist, politician and writer (1905–1984

- Born: Mabel Ellen Dove; 1905; Accra, Gold Coast
- Died: 1984 (aged 78–79)
- Other names: Marjorie Mensah; Dama Dumas; Ebun Alakija; Akosua Dzatsui
- Occupations: Journalist, politician and writer
- Notable work: The Adventures of the Black Girl in her Search for Mr Shaw (1934); Selected Writings of a Pioneer West African Feminist (2004)
- Spouse(s): J. B. Danquah (m, 1933; div. mid-1940s)
- Relatives: Frans Dove (father); Evelyn Dove (sister); Frank Dove (brother); Dove Family

Mabel Dove Danquah (1905 – 1984) was a Gold Coast-born journalist, political activist, creative writer and one of the earliest women in West Africa to work in these fields. Most notably she became the first woman to be elected a member of any African legislative assembly.

As Francis Elsbend Kofigah notes in relation to Ghana's literary pioneers, "before the emergence of such strong exponents of literary feminism as Efua Sutherland and Ama Ata Aidoo, there was Mabel Dove Danquah, the trail-blazing feminist." She used various pseudonyms in her writing for newspapers from the 1930s: "Marjorie Mensah" in The Times of West Africa; "Dama Dumas" in the African Morning Post; "Ebun Alakija" in the Nigerian Daily Times; and "Akosua Dzatsui" in the Accra Evening News.

== Education and early years ==
Mabel Ellen Dove was born in Accra, Gold Coast (now Ghana), to Eva Buckman, a businesswoman in Osu, and (Francis) Frans Dove (1869–1949), a lawyer from Sierra Leone, who was the first President of the Gold Coast Bar. With her sisters, Mabel at the age of six was taken to Annie Walsh Memorial School in Freetown, Sierra Leone. While at school in Freetown, she founded a cricket club. Mabel received further education in England at Anglican Convent in Bury St. Edmunds and St. Michael's College, Hurstpierpoint, where she took a secretarial course, against the wishes of her father. She was sent back to Freetown, and while there she helped set up a women's cricket club, participated in the local dramatics society and read extensively, before returning at the age of 21 to the Gold Coast. She found employment as a shorthand-typist with Elder Dempster for eight years, then transferred to G. B. Olivant, before going to work as a Manager with the trading company of A. G. Leventis.

== Journalism ==
She started writing for The Times of West Africa, Ghana's first daily newspaper, which was founded and owned by Dr J. B. Danquah and strongly advocated fundamental human rights while denouncing foreign domination. Through the column "Ladies Corner [later Women's] by Marjorie Mensah" (1931–34), her articles won her great public popularity: "she dared women to break with form, to derive inspiration from the suffragists, to denounce imperialism, and to fight for their rights." She also won the admiration of the paper's proprietor, whom she eventually married in 1933. In 1939, she gave radio talks in support of the war effort.

After The Times of West Africa ceased to function, she went on to write for the African Morning Post (1935–40), the Nigerian Daily Times (1936–37), the Accra Evening News (1950–1960s) and the Daily Graphic (1952). When in 1951 she took on the editorship of the Accra Evening News — the paper of the Convention People's Party (CPP), founded in 1948 — she was the second woman ever to edit a newspaper in Ghana. Although the appointment ended after five months because of disagreement with CPP leader Kwame Nkrumah over editorial methods, she remained loyal to Nkrumah and the party.

== Politics ==
Her involvement with politics started after Kwame Nkrumah founded his Convention People's Party (CPP), in 1949, and she became a member of staff of the nationalist Accra Evening News, joining the campaign for the end of British rule and immediate self-government for the Gold Coast. She created the awareness and the need for self-governance through her works. In the general election of 1954, she was committed to organising women for the CPP, and she was subsequently put up as a CPP candidate for Ga Rural constituency, which she won. Her election made her the first female member of the Legislative Assembly of the Gold Coast and the first African woman elected to an African Legislative Assembly.

== Creative writing ==
She was a prolific author over a period of four decades – her published collections of short stories include The Happenings of the Night (1931), The Adventures of the Black Girl in her Search for Mr Shaw (1934), Anticipation (1947), The Torn Veil (1947), Payment (1947), Invisible Scar (1966) and Evidence of Passion (1969) — until her literary career was curtailed by her blindness in 1972. Her work is anthologised in collections including Langston Hughes′ An African Treasury: Articles, Essays, Stories, Poems (1960), and Margaret Busby's 1992 Daughters of Africa; (her niece Nah Dove featured in the 2019 follow-up volume New Daughters of Africa). A collection of Mabel Dove's work, Selected Writings of a Pioneer West African Feminist (edited by Stephanie Newell and Audrey Gadzekpo), was published in 2004.

== Personal life ==
In September 1933, Dove married the political statesman and historian J. B. Danquah and they had a son, Vladimir. However, the marriage "did not survive Danquah's prolonged absence during the period 1934–36 when he was in England as secretary of the Gold Coast delegation" and the couple divorced in the mid-1940s.

== Selected bibliography ==
- The Happenings of the Night (1931)
- The Adventures of the Black Girl in her Search for Mr Shaw (1934)
- Anticipation (1947)
- The Torn Veil (1947)
- Payment (1947)
- Invisible Scar (1966)
- Evidence of Passion (1969)
- Selected Writings of a Pioneer West African Feminist (edited by Stephanie Newell and Audrey Gadzekpo). Nottingham: Trent Editions, 2004. ISBN 1 84233 097 7.

== Legacy ==
Dove's satire of George Bernard Shaw's The Adventures of the Black Girl in Her Search for God (1932), which she titled The Adventures of the Black Girl in her Search for Mr Shaw, was included in the British Library's 2015–16 exhibition West Africa: Word, Symbol, Song. Her great-niece, Tiffany Dove-Abbam (daughter of Gisela Abbam), formed The Dove Foundation for Global Change in Dove's honour.
