= Esther Bruce =

British seamstress and author (1912–1994)

- Born: 29 November 1912; Fulham, London, England
- Died: 17 July 1994 (aged 81); Chelsea, London, England
- Known for: Aunt Esther's Story (1991)

Josephine Esther Bruce (29 November 1912 – 17 July 1994) was a British seamstress living in London. Her autobiography, Aunt Esther's Story published in 1991 and co-authored with her adopted nephew Stephen Bourne, was one of the first books to document the life of a black working-class woman in Britain.

== Early life ==
Esther Bruce was born on 29 November 1912 at 15 Dieppe Street, Fulham, in west London. Her parents were Joseph Adolphus Bruce (1880–1941), a builder's labourer from British Guiana, and his London-born wife, Edith, who died in 1918 when Esther was just five years old.

Formerly a merchant seaman, Joseph settled in Fulham at the turn of the century and worked as a coach painter and film extra until his death in 1941 from an accident in an air raid. He appeared in films such as Sanders of the River (1935) and Chu Chin Chow (1934).

For many years, Esther and her father were among the few black members of their working-class community where she attended North End Road School, Fulham. Joseph taught his daughter to have pride in being black and being British and to stand up to racism. When a teacher at Bruce's school told her classmates "not to talk to coloured people", it was Joseph's complaints which resulted in the teacher being dismissed.

== Later life and career ==
Bruce left school when she was 14 years old to work in domestic service but, after being exploited, she changed careers and found work as a seamstress. A few years later, she was sacked by Barker's department store on Kensington High Street for "being coloured". Her angry father raised a complaint with Barker's the very next day and wrote to his local MP, but the complaint was taken no further.

In the 1930s, Bruce met and befriended two influential figures of the time: the Jamaican nationalist leader Marcus Garvey and the popular American singer Elisabeth Welch, for whom she also made dresses.

During the Second World War, Bruce worked as a cleaner in Brompton Hospital and volunteered as a fire watcher. She helped to unite the community during this period and wrote to her family in Guyana to ask if food parcels could be sent over to help alleviate the effect of rationing. A "great big box arrived, full of food" courtesy of her dad's brother in Guyana. Bruce then wrote back requesting more food parcels be sent.

After the war, Bruce continued to work at Brompton Hospital as a seamstress in the linen room until 1956, before working for a curtain manufacturer in Fulham. Bruce adapted easily to life in post-war Britain but admitted that racism was still very much an issue in the years that followed despite the new increasingly multi-cultural society the arrival of the first Caribbean settlers to the United Kingdom on the Empire Windrush in 1948 helped usher in. Of the Notting Hill race riots of 1958, she recorded:

"It was a terrible time for black people. I didn't think anything like that would ever happen in this country. Afterwards I noticed a change in some white people.... if they'd stopped Enoch Powell and the National Front right at the beginning they wouldn't have got a hold’".

Bruce retired in 1972, but she continued working as a seamstress until her failing eyesight caused her to finally stop at the age of seventy-four.

== Death and legacy ==
In 1991, Fulham and Hammersmith's Ethnic Communities Oral History Project published her autobiography, Aunt Esther's Story. Co-authored with her adopted nephew Stephen Bourne, it was the first book to document the life of a black working-class woman in Britain.

For this, Bourne and Bruce were nominated for the Arts Council of Great Britain's Raymond Williams Prize for Community Publishing. Photographs from the book were included as part of the Museum of London's The Peopling of London exhibition that toured around various venues in London, including the Black Cultural Archives in Brixton.

The writer Simon Reade described Bruce's story as:

"A personal yet archetypal chapter in the history of working-class London, one which is usually overlooked in the grand catalogue of great men. It should inspire young people to explore the thoughts and observations of an older generation of family and friends, thus discovering shared experiences throughout our multi-racial, culturally diverse metropolis".

Bruce died at the Chelsea and Westminster Hospital on 17 July 1994. Her ashes were scattered on her parents' unmarked grave in Fulham Cemetery.

In 2020, Stephen Bourne included Bruce in his book Under Fire - Black Britain in Wartime 1939-45 (The History Press).
