= Joe Appleton =

Jamaican jazz saxophonist and clarinetist

Joe Appleton (1900–1991) was a jazz saxophonist and clarinetist from the West Indies.

Appleton moved to Britain in the 1920s, and he played in dance bands both there and on the Continent through the end of the decade. In 1934 he played in Leslie Thompson's Emperors of Jazz, and was leading his own band by 1937; he also worked with Jiver Hutchinson and Cyril Blake in the second half of the decade. He appears on the Rex Stewart release Muscat Ramble, which was released on Amiga Records (an Eastern European label), and which became a highly sought-after collector's item. Appleton led his own bands in London into the 1950s.
