= Gisela Abbam =

Ghanaian-British businesswoman

Gisela Abbam OBE FRSA
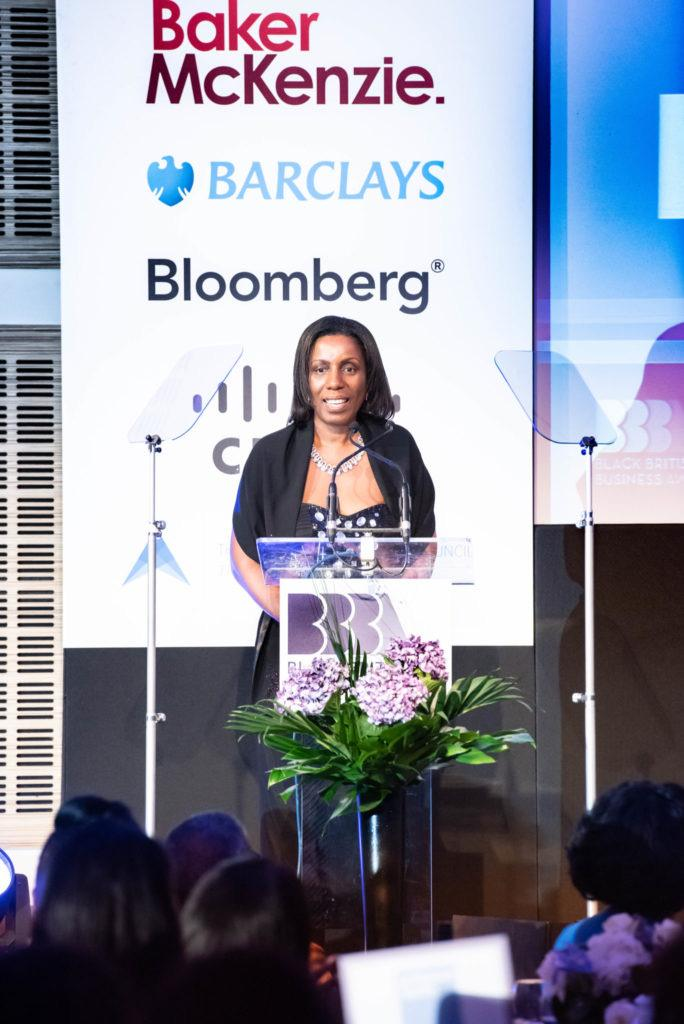
- Abbam receiving the Black British business person of the year award (2019)
- Born: Gisela Maame Abbam; Ghana
- Education: Wesley Girls' Senior High School; University of Cape Coast; Middlesex University
- Occupation: Business executive
- Known for: First black Chair of the General Pharmaceutical Council and British Science Association

Gisela Abbam is a Ghanaian-British businesswoman working in both the private and public sector who has focused on the healthcare industry. She is the first black Chair of the General Pharmaceutical Council, as well as the first female chair, and is the first black chair of the British Science Association. She is a board member of the Bar Standards Board, a commissioner on the National Preparedness Commission as well as a senior director at Revvity. She is a former Global Executive Director at General Electric and an advisor at National Institute for Health and Care Excellence.

Abbam has had an extensive career in both the public and private sectors, including at NICE (the National Institute for Health and Care Excellence), and General Electric (otherwise known as GE), where she set up a global function that within a year was generating $600 million with a pipeline of $3 billion, as well as Abt Associates and PerkinElmer. From the UN to the World Bank and all the way to the WTO, Gisela has worked with, advised and negotiated with many multilateral organisations, as well as governments such as Turkey, France, and the US. More recently she hosted the high-level Ukrainian delegation who came to the UK to start the process of rebuilding their security and health systems. Gisela was presented with a Ukrainian medal at this meeting.

== Early life and education ==
Abbam was born in Ghana to H.E Peter Abbam, a Ghanaian ambassador from the royal House of Ghartey and Eileen Abbam (née Dove), a former headmistress at Ridge Church School and a daughter of Frans Dove, a Sierra Leonean barrister and notable member of the West African aristocratic Dove Family. She attended Wesley Girls' Senior High School and later earned a bachelor's degree in Education with honours from the University of Cape Coast, and an MBA from Middlesex University.

Abbam credits members of her family such as her uncle Hon. Alex Quaison-Sackey and Aunt Mabel Dove as being early role models.

== Career ==
Abbam is a Senior Global Executive and the Chair of the General Pharmaceutical Council, UK. She was also the Chair of the British Science Association. Other boards on which she serves include the Bar Standards Board Everywoman and the Briyah Institute. She is a committee member for the Longitude Prize.

She has worked in collaboration with governments, the World Health Organization (WHO), the United Nations, World Bank and other bodies to improve health outcomes. Additionally, she is a subject matter expert in global health solutions, has written more than 50 white papers on various public policy issues, and is a sought-after speaker for international conferences.

Abbam worked at the National Institute for Health and Care Excellence early on in her career.

In 2007, she joined General Electric Healthcare, where she was the first Head of Government Affairs & Policy for UK & Ireland. She subsequently became the inaugural Global Executive Director for Government Affairs and Policy for General Electric Healthcare and set up the Division globally. She was responsible for the strategic direction of government affairs and policy for GE Healthcare, the then $18 billion business unit of GE that provides transformational medical technologies to health customers in more than 100 countries. Gisela drove business growth and initiated more than £1 billion new business opportunities over a five-year period.

In 2009, she initiated and led an early diagnosis campaign in UK with a number of NGOs. This was aimed at Members of Parliament and resulted in access to direct referral for diagnostics by General Practitioners amongst others as well as gaining the support of then Prime Minister, David Cameron.

She was the founding Chair of the Global Diagnostic Imaging, Healthcare IT & Radiation Therapy Trade Association (DITTA) Global Health Working Group, which represents more than 600 companies and is focused on working with WHO and the World Bank.

In 2016, she was one of 14 people selected to serve as a Committee Member for the Global Health and the Future Role of the United States – a report for the incoming Trump Administration by the US National Academies of Science, Engineering and Medicines

She was a key part of the team that successfully negotiated trade policy at WTO on the elimination of tariffs on key medical devices to enable increased access for patients in 80 countries.

She was the Director of Strategic Partnerships and Company Officer for Abt Associates, one of the top 20 global research firms and top 40 International development innovators.

She has been the inaugural Executive in her last four roles and is successful at creating new functions and making them commercially viable. She also guest lectures at University College London. She has also guest lectured at Leeds Business School.

As Chair of BSA, she led a focus on health science and engaging the public considering the scientific evidence in relation to their during COVID.

As Chair of Council of the General Pharmaceutical Council (GPhC) the regulator for Pharmacy she is responsible for the strategic direction and governance of the 92,000 plus pharmacy professionals. She has hosted roundtables across the country to engage the profession and listen to their concerns. She launched the new 5 year strategy at the Houses of Parliament in June, 2025 with Steve Race MP and Stephen Kinnock MP and Minister of State for Care.

She is a founding Trustee of The Dove Foundation for Global Change, a policy-driven charity that works with governments and the private sector to shape implementable policy, while also running on-the-ground programmes for communities. Its present focus is on improving outcomes for women and girls set up in the memory of Abbam's Aunt Mabel Dove, run by Abbam's daughter, Tiffany Dove-Abbam.

== Honours and awards ==
- Fellow of the Royal Society of Arts
- Black British Business person of the year
- Iconic Woman creating a better World for All by the Women Economic Forum
- 100 Women to Watch for FTSE 350 Index Boards by Cranfield
- Global Goodwill Ambassador
- Honorary Fellow of the British Science Association
