= Frans Dove =

Sierra Leonean barrister in the Gold Coast (1869–1949)

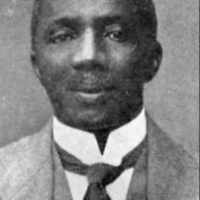
- Portrait of Dove
- Born: Francis Thomas Dove; 24 June 1869; Freetown, Colony of Sierra Leone
- Died: 1949 (aged 79–80); London, England
- Other name: Frans Dove
- Education: CMS Grammar School; Fourah Bay College
- Alma mater: Lincoln's Inn
- Occupation: Barrister
- Spouse: Augusta Winchester (m. 1896; died 1947)
- Partner: Eva Buckman
- Children: Frank Dove; Evelyn Dove; Mabel Dove Danquah
- Parent(s): William Thomas Dove; Mary Ann Gerber

Francis Thomas Dove (24 June 1869 – 1949), known as Frans Dove, was a Sierra Leone Creole barrister who practised in the Gold Coast (now Ghana) for more than fifty years. He was the first President of the Gold Coast Bar, a forerunner of the Ghana Bar Association, and took a leading part in organising tennis, cricket and horse racing in Accra. His children included the soldier and Olympic boxer Frank Dove, the singer Evelyn Dove and the journalist and politician Mabel Dove Danquah.

== Early life and education ==
Dove was born in Freetown on 24 June 1869 to William Thomas Dove and Mary Ann Gerber, members of the city's Creole community. He was one of five brothers. He was educated at the CMS Grammar School and Fourah Bay College, and at the age of 17 went to England to study law. (Note: Some sources say he studied at University College London; others describe him as "Oxford-educated".)

== Legal career ==
Dove was admitted to Lincoln's Inn on 21 September 1888 and called to the bar on 10 June 1891, at the age of 21. In 1897 he was enrolled as a barrister of the Supreme Court of the Gold Coast, and he practised in Accra for the rest of his career, appearing before Chief Justice William Brandford Griffith and his successors. He was the first President of the Gold Coast Bar.

His practice made him wealthy. His house at Tudu, in central Accra, stood in large grounds that included tennis courts.

== Sport ==
Dove is credited with introducing lawn tennis to the Gold Coast. With his brothers Silas, Arthur and Horace he played cricket and tennis for the Gold Coast in inter-colonial matches against Nigeria, a series he helped to set up and which was later extended to Sierra Leone and the Gambia.

He was chairman of the Accra Turf Club and promoted horse racing in the colony, where a racecourse had been laid out near James Town in 1877.

== Personal life and family ==
In 1896 Dove married Augusta Winchester (1877–1947), an Englishwoman from Sussex. They had two children. Frank Dove (1897–1957) won the Military Medal with the Tank Corps at the Battle of Cambrai and boxed for Great Britain at the 1920 Summer Olympics. Evelyn Dove (1902–1987) became the first black woman to sing on BBC Radio, in 1925. Augusta brought up the children in Battersea, London, while Dove worked in Accra.

With Eva Buckman, a businesswoman from Osu, Dove had several daughters, among them Mabel Dove Danquah (1905–1984), who in 1954 became the first woman elected to the Legislative Assembly of the Gold Coast. He sent his daughters to school in Freetown, where Mabel began at a school run by his sister Lydia Dove, and then to England.

== Death ==
Dove died in London in 1949, aged 80, shortly after an operation. (Note: Sources give both 22 July 1949 and 22 August 1949 as the date of death.) His body was returned to Accra for burial.
