= Albert Francis King =

American painter (1854–1945)

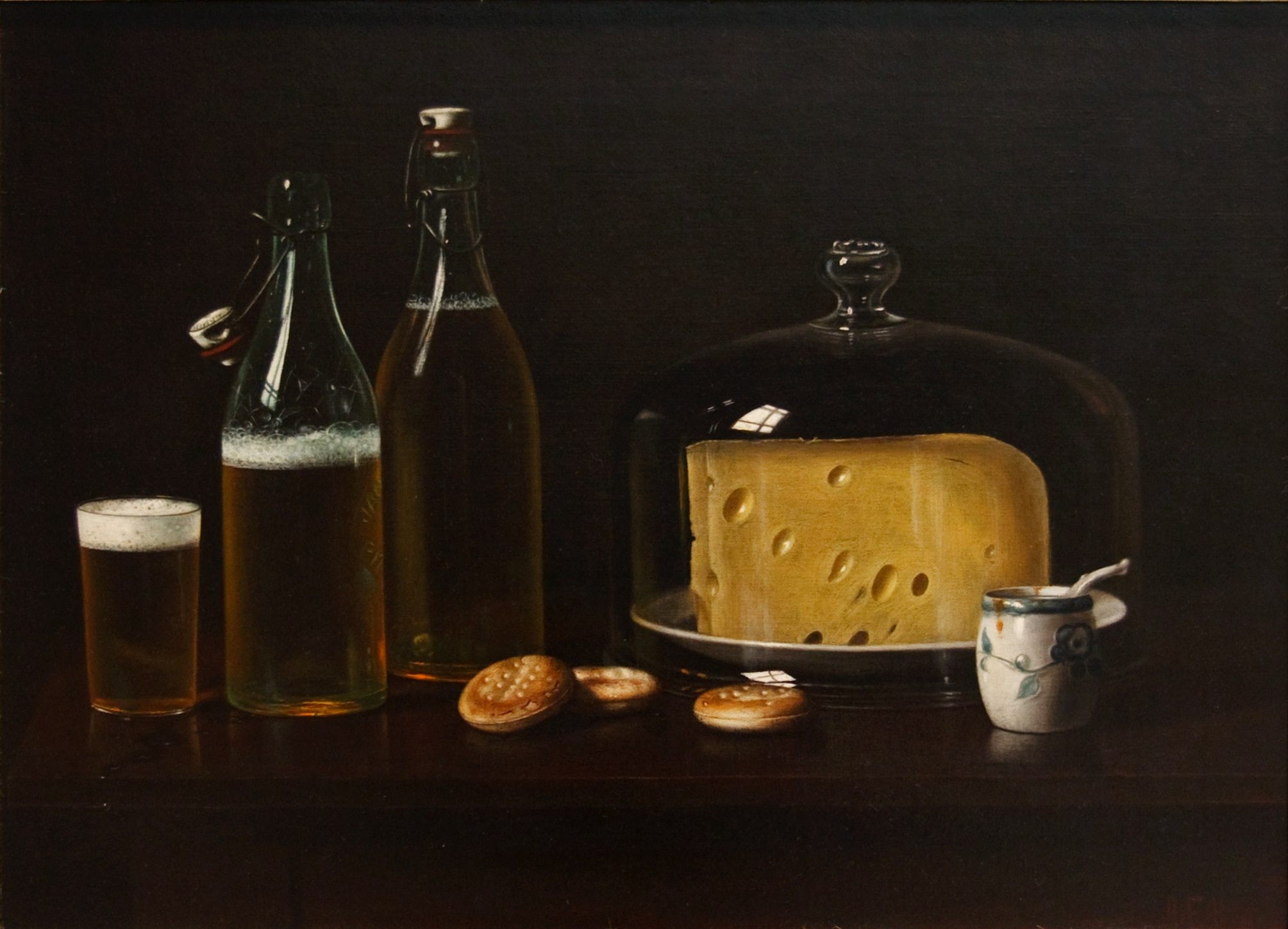

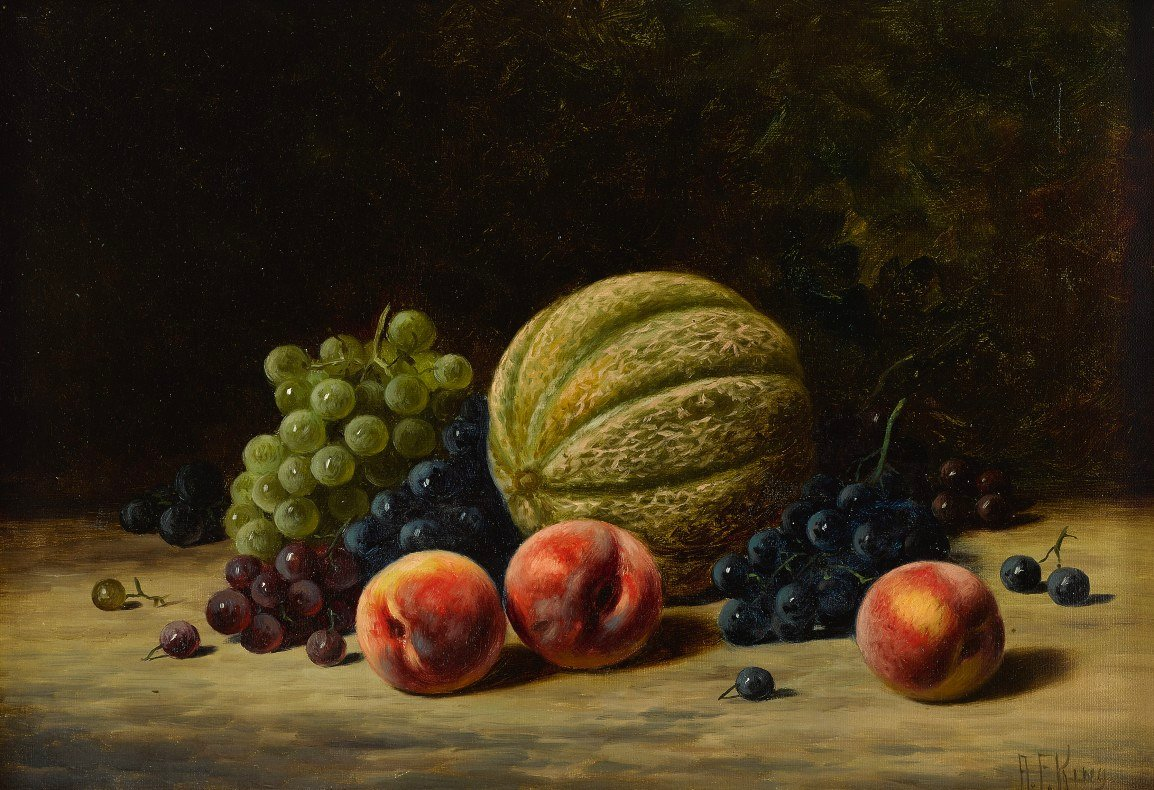

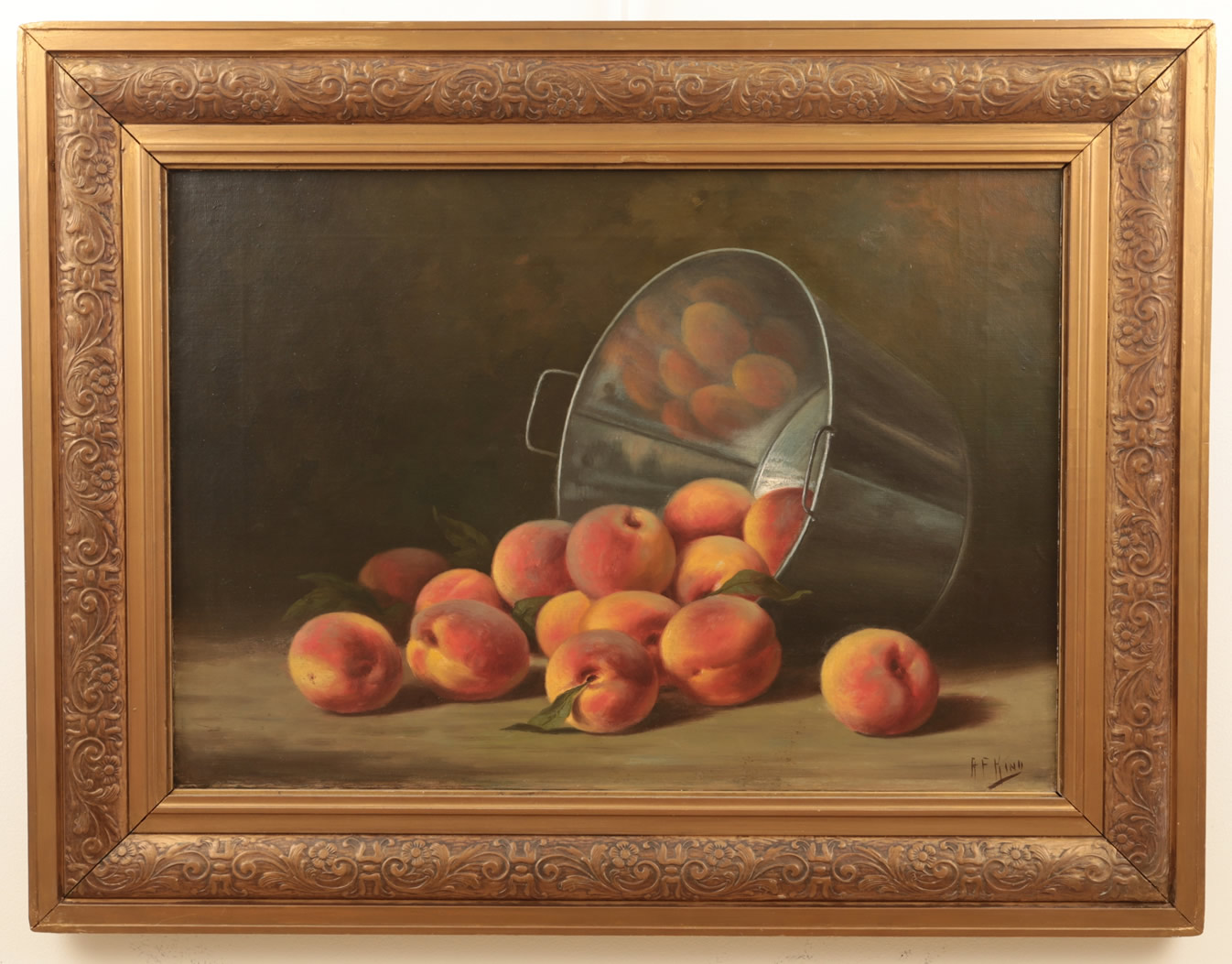

Albert Francis King (1854–1945) was a prominent American painter, known primarily for his highly realistic still life paintings of fruit and vegetables. He was recognised as Pittsburgh's primary still-life painter of the 19th century and was also a sought-after portraitist for many prominent citizens, including Andrew Carnegie, Henry Heinz, and Henry Clay Frick.

== Style And Subjects ==
King was largely self-taught, but his work is noted for its meticulous realism and illusionistic qualities, often compared to the style of the 18th-century French painter Jean-Baptiste-Siméon Chardin. His primary subjects included:

- Still life: Watermelons (often with a wedge missing), apples, peaches, grapes, strawberries in chip baskets, and fish.
- Portraits: He painted numerous leading figures of his day, including composer Stephen Foster and President William McKinley.
- Landscapes: For pleasure, he also created sylvan landscapes in the Hudson River style, often working at the "Scalp Level" area near Johnstown, Pennsylvania.
