= Cyril Blake =

Trinidad and Tobago musician

Cyril "Midnight" Blake (22 October 1900 – 3 December 1951) was a Trinidadian jazz trumpeter.

== Biography ==
Born in Trinidad, Blake first showed interest in music by taking up the banjo and guitar while visiting relatives in New York. Reaching England as a stowaway in 1916 he served in the merchant navy for several years. From 1921 he played guitar in a British group called the Southern Syncopated Orchestra. In 1923 he married Olive Douglas in Manchester.

Blake worked at various clubs in Paris and London throughout the 1920s, changing his instrument to trumpet. In 1928 he toured Europe with Thompson’s Negro Band. In the 1930s he played in the band of his drummer brother George 'Happy' Blake - a regular at the Shim Shim Club - and with the pianist Jack London. Blake also played in bands led by Leon Abbey, the clarinetist Rudolph Dunbar, Leslie Thompson, Joe Appleton, and Lauderic Caton.

In 1938 he formed his own band, which was centred on Jig's Club in London's Soho, where live performances were recorded several times, showing a growing involvement in African-Caribbean music. In the 1940s Blake led his band behind Lord Kitchener for recordings on Parlophone Records, playing in a calypso style. He played at a succession of clubs, including the Bag O'Nails (1942), Havana Club (1942), Barbarina (1942-3), Panama (1946) and Blue Lagoon (1948).

Late in his life he returned to Trinidad, where he continued as a bandleader. Returning to guitar, Blake led his own Calyspo Serenaders in 1950. He died in 1951.

According to Dave Haslam, Cyril and his brother George significantly influenced the course of British jazz by introducing calypso and Latin American influences.
