= Bertie King =

Jamaican musician (1912–1981)

Albert King (1912–1981), known as Bertie King, was a Jamaican jazz and mento musician. He played the clarinet and the saxophone.

== Biography ==
King was born in Panama, and raised in Kingston, where he attended Alpha Boys School.

During the 1930s he led his own band, Bertie King and his Rhythm Aces, described at the time as "Jamaica's Foremost Dance Orchestra". In 1936 he left for England, sailing on the same ship as his friend Jiver Hutchinson. In London he joined Ken Snakehips Johnson's West Indian Dance Band, and later played with Leslie Hutchinson's band. He also worked with visiting American musicians including Benny Carter, George Shearing and Coleman Hawkins. In 1937 he recorded four sides in the Netherlands with Benny Carter, and in 1938 he recorded with Django Reinhardt in Paris. In 1939 he joined the Royal Navy. He left the Navy in 1943 and formed his own band, also working and recording with Nat Gonella.

King returned to Jamaica in 1951, where he started his own band, known as the Casa Blanca Orchestra, playing in the mento style. Since there were no Jamaican record labels at this time, he arranged for his recordings to be pressed in a plant in Lewisham, England, owned by Decca Records. He returned a number of times to England, working and recording with Kenny Baker, George Chisholm, Chris Barber, Kenny Graham and Humphrey Lyttelton, and also toured in Asia and Africa with his own band. During this period he also played and recorded in London with some of the leading Trinidadian calypsonians. He was noted for his impassive demeanour on stage, which belied an expressive playing style.

King led the Jamaica Broadcasting Corporation's house band in the 1950s; his sidemen included Ernest Ranglin and Tommy Mowatt. He recorded extensively with this outfit. In 1965 he moved to the USA. His last known public performance was at Jamaican Independence Day celebrations in New York City in 1967. He died in the USA in 1981.
