= Leslie Thompson (musician) =

Jamaican jazz trumpeter (1901–1987)

- Born: Leslie Anthony Joseph Thompson; 17 October 1901; Kingston, Jamaica
- Died: 26 December 1987 (aged 86) London, England
- Genres: Jazz
- Occupations: Trumpeter and trombonist
- Instruments: Trumpet, trombone

Leslie Anthony Joseph Thompson (17 October 1901 – 26 December 1987) was a Jamaican jazz trumpeter and trombonist who moved to England in 1929.

== Biography ==
Leslie Thompson was born in Kingston, Jamaica, where he studied music as a child at the Roman Catholic Alpha Cottage School. When he was 16, he joined the West India Regiment and played in their band locally in Kingston movie palaces in the 1920s, before moving to London, England, in 1929 and studying at Kneller Hall. He had been unable to become a bandmaster in the army because of rules preventing black soldiers becoming officers. He also played euphonium and cornet.

In 1930, he began playing with Spike Hughes, where he played trumpet, trombone, and double bass until 1932. In 1934–35, Thompson toured Europe with Louis Armstrong, then formed his own band, intended to be all-black (although initially with two white trombonists who blacked up), with the help of Ken "Snakehips" Johnson, who himself took over control of this band in 1936. Jiver Hutchinson was one of his sidemen.

In 1936–37, Thompson played with Benny Carter, and later in the 1930s played double bass with Edmundo Ros. Thompson served in the Royal Artillery on the south coast of England during World War II and was active in dance halls and nightclubs after the war, but stopped playing music professionally after 1954 and later became a parole officer.

He was inspired by Marcus Garvey and an Anglican. Thompson's autobiography (edited by Jeffrey Green) was first published by Rabbit Press in 1985, and was reissued as Swing from a Small Island – The Story of Leslie Thompson by Northway Publications in 2009, when Chris Searle commented in the Morning Star: "Thompson’s story is one to read, one to learn from and one to remember."
