= Jiver Hutchinson =

Jamaican jazz trumpeter (1906–1959)

- Born: Leslie George Hutchinson; 18 March 1906; Jamaica
- Died: 22 November 1959 (aged 53); Weeting, Norfolk, England
- Occupations: Jazz trumpeter and bandleader
- Children: Elaine Delmar

Leslie George "Jiver" Hutchinson (18 March 1906 – 22 November 1959) was a Jamaican jazz trumpeter and bandleader.

== Biography ==
Leslie George Hutchinson was born on 18 March 1906 at Hope Road, Cross Roads, St Andrew Parish, Jamaica.

Hutchinson played in the band of Bertie King in Jamaica in the 1930s, then moved to England, where he played with Happy Blake's Cuba Club Band. In 1936, Hutchinson played in Leslie Thompson's Emperors of Jazz and in 1938 with Ken "Snakehips" Johnson, then joined Geraldo's band in 1939. Hutchinson led his own ensemble from 1944 to 1950, featuring many of the musicians from Thompson's band. His ensemble toured the UK and Europe, and did concerts in India in 1945. He also recorded with the ensemble in 1947. He returned to play with Geraldo after the group's dissolution, and recorded with pianist Mary Lou Williams in 1952.

Hutchinson was killed in a car crash in Weeting, Norfolk, in 1959 aged 53, while on tour with his band. His daughter is the singer Elaine Delmar.

== See also ==
- First English Public Jam Session

== Other sources ==
- Howard Rye and John Cowley, "Jiver Hutchinson". Grove Jazz online.
