= Jeffrey Green (historian) =

British historian and writer (born 1944)

- Born: Jeffrey Philip Green; 9 October 1944 (age 82); Nuneaton, Warwickshire, England
- Occupations: Historian and writer
- Notable work: Black Europe
- Website: jeffreygreen.co.uk

Jeffrey Philip Green (born 9 October 1944) is a British historian and writer, who has been particularly active in researching and documenting the Black British experience, publishing books and articles since the 1980s.

== Early life ==
Jeffrey Green was born in 1944 in Nuneaton, Warwickshire, and grew up in London, England.

== Career ==
Green worked for Grindlays Bank both in London and Uganda, and as an export manager for British manufacturers. He has worked as an independent historian for more than three decades. His notable work on Black British history includes research into the life of composer Samuel Coleridge-Taylor that culminated in the 2011 biography Samuel Coleridge-Taylor, a Musical Life. Green edited trumpeter Leslie Thompson's autobiography, first published in 1985 and reissued as Swing from a Small Island - The Story of Leslie Thompson by Northway Publications in 2009.

Green has written more than 30 articles for the Oxford Dictionary of National Biography. Other publications to which he has contributed include The Oxford Companion to Black British History, The Grove Dictionary of Jazz, The Journal of Caribbean History, Black Music Research Journal, Black Perspective in Music, New Community, Storyville and History Today.

In History Today in 2000, he argued that the black presence in the UK before 1940 had largely been ignored by historians. He is a regular participant in seminars and conferences.

Green has also been active in trying to trace fugitive slaves who escaped from the US to the UK.

In 2015, he was nominated for a Grammy (jointly with Rainer Lotz and Howard Rye) for work on the 44-CD boxed set with two books, Black Europe, which rescued recordings made in Europe by people of African descent prior to 1928.

Green lives in East Grinstead, Sussex.

A collection of Green's research papers, reference material, and papers of the Barbour-James family that he acquired after the death of Amy Barbour-James, are held at the Black Cultural Archives. Green's website, founded in 2009 partly in response to what he regarded as "ill-founded articles on history and also to make available images and documents that he had been accumulating since the late 1970s", was in 2020 taken on by the British Library as part of the national UK Web Archive.

== Publications ==
=== Books ===
- Edmund Thornton Jenkins: The Life and Times of an American Black Composer, 1894-1926, Greenwood Press, 1982. ISBN 978-0313232534
- Black Edwardians: Black People in Britain 1901-1914, Routledge, 1998. ISBN 978-0714644264
- Samuel Coleridge-Taylor, a Musical Life, London: Pickering and Chatto, 2011. ISBN 978-1848931619
- Coleridge-Taylor: A Centenary Celebration, London: History and Social Action Publications, 2012. ISBN 978-0954894382
- Black Americans in Victorian Britain, Pen & Sword, 2018. ISBN 978 1 52673 759 5

=== Contributions in collections ===
- "Thomas Lewis Johnson (1836–1921): the Bournemouth Evangelist"; "George William Christian (1872–1924): Liverpool Merchant"; "Dr J. J. Brown of Hackney (1882–1953)", in Rainer Lotz and Ian Pegg (eds), Under the Imperial Carpet: Essays in Black History 1780–1950 (Rabbit Press, 1986). ISBN 978-0948775017
- "The Negro Renaissance and England", in Samuel A. Floyd, Jr. (ed.), Black Music in the Harlem Renaissance (Greenwood Press, 1980, and University of Tennessee Press, 1993).
- "A Revelation in Strange Humanity: Six Congo Pygmies in Britain, 1905–1907", in Bernth Lindfors (ed.), Africans on Stage. Studies in Ethnological Show Business (Indiana University Press, 1999). ISBN 978-0253334688

=== Selected articles in journals ===
- "Roland Hayes in London, 1921", Black Perspective in Music, New York (Spring 1982).
- "'In Dahomey' in London in 1903", Black Perspective in Music (Spring 1983).
- "The Coloured Man’s Complaint", New Community, Journal of the Commission for Racial Equality, London (Autumn/Winter 1983).
- "Beef Pie with a Suet Crust. A Black Childhood in Wigan (1906–1920)", New Community (Spring 1984).
- "Conversation with Leslie Thompson", Black Perspective in Music, New York (Spring 1984).
- "Edward T. Nelson (1874–1940)", New Community (Winter 1984–1985).
- "Some Recent Findings on Samuel Coleridge-Taylor", with Paul McGilchrist, Black Perspective in Music, New York (Fall 1985).
- "A Black Community? – London, 1919", Immigrants and Minorities, London (March 1986).
- "West Indian Doctors in London: John Alcindor (1873–1924) and James Jackson Brown (1882–1953)", The Journal of Caribbean History (June 1986).
- "John Alexander Barbour-James (1867–1954)", New Community (Autumn 1986).
- "Samuel Coleridge-Taylor: a Postscript", with Paul McGilchrist, Black Perspective in Music, New York (Fall 1986).
- "High Society and Black Entertainers in the 1920s and 1930s", New Community (Spring 1987).
- "John Alcindor (1873–1924): A Migrant’s Biography", Immigrants and Minorities (July 1987).
- "Some Findings on Britain’s Black Working Class, 1900–1914", Immigrants and Minorities (July 1990).
- "Conversation with Josephine Harreld Love", Black Perspective in Music, New York (1990).
- "'The Foremost Musician of his Race': Samuel Coleridge-Taylor of England, 1875–1912", Black Music Research Journal, Center for Black Music Research, Columbia College, Chicago (Fall 1990).
- "The Jamaica Native Choir in Britain, 1906–1908", Black Music Research Journal (Spring 1993).
- "Samuel Coleridge-Taylor: The Early Years" and "Requiem – Hiawatha in the 1920s and 1930s", Black Music Research Journal (Fall 2001), a volume edited by Jeffrey Green.
- "Black Musical Internationalism in England in the 1920s", with Howard Rye, Black Music Research Journal (Spring 1995).
- "Memories of the SSO: Descendants Speak" and "Edmund Jenkins of South Carolina", Black Music Research Journal (Spring 2010), a volume dedicated to the Southern Syncopated Orchestra.
