= 1963 in jazz =

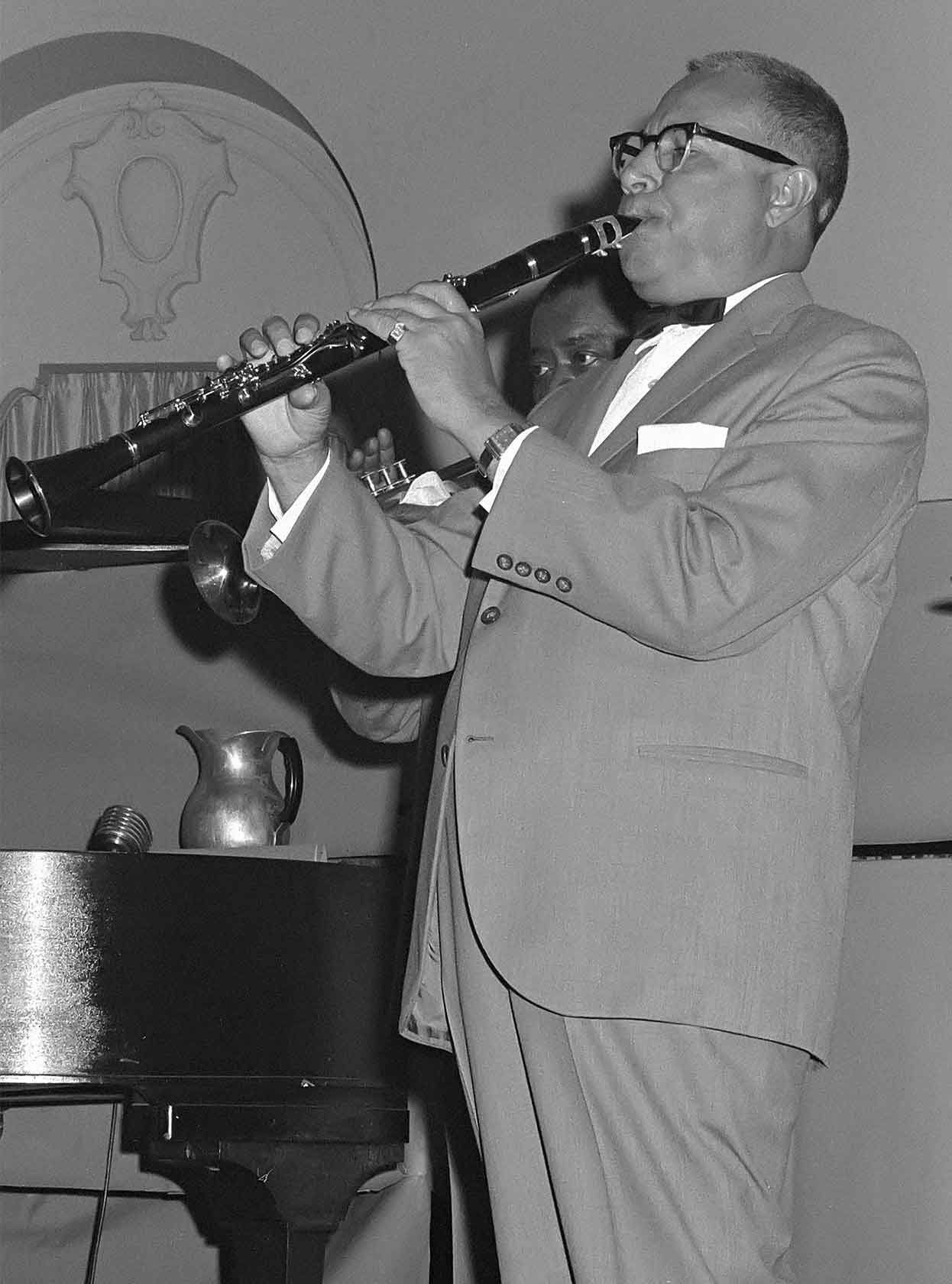
- Joe Darensbourg playing clarinet with the Louis Armstrong combo at the Palais Royal in South Bend, IN, 1963
- Decade: 1960s in jazz
- Music: 1963 in music
- Standards: List of post-1950 jazz standards
- See also: 1962 in jazz – 1964 in jazz

This is a timeline documenting events of Jazz in the year 1963.

== Events ==
=== May ===
- 15 – The 5th Annual Grammy Awards were held in Chicago, Los Angeles and New York.
  - Ella Fitzgerald awarded Best Solo Vocal Performance, Female for Ella Swings Brightly with Nelson
  - Stan Getz awarded Best Jazz Performance – Soloist Or Small Group (Instrumental) for "Desafinado"
  - Stan Kenton awarded Best Jazz Performance – Large Group (Instrumental) for Adventures In Jazz
  - Vince Guaraldi awarded Best Original Jazz Composition for the composition "Cast Your Fate to the Wind" performed by the Vince Guaraldi Trio

=== July ===
- 4 – The 10th Newport Jazz Festival started in Newport, Rhode Island (July 4 – 7).

== Album releases ==
- Chris Barber: "Chris Barber at the BBC" with Joe Harriott and Ottilie Patterson
- Art Blakey and the Jazz Messengers
  - Caravan
  - Buhaina's Delight
  - Ugetsu
- Kenny Burrell: Midnight Blue
- Betty Carter: 'Round Midnight
- Miles Davis: Seven Steps to Heaven
- Eric Dolphy: Iron Man (recorded, released 1968)
- Duke Ellington
  - Money Jungle with Charles Mingus and Max Roach
  - My People
  - The Symphonic Ellington
- Bill Evans: Conversations with Myself
- Joe Harriott: Movement
- Joe Henderson: Page One
- Sheila Jordan: Portrait of Sheila
- Stan Kenton: Artistry in Bossa Nova
- Charles Mingus: The Black Saint and the Sinner Lady
- Hank Mobley: No Room for Squares
- Thelonious Monk: Criss Cross
- Thelonious Monk: Monk's Dream
- Prince Lasha Quintet Featuring Sonny Simmons: The Cry!
- Sun Ra: Cosmic Tones For Mental Therapy (recorded, released 1967)
- Sonny Rollins: Our Man in Jazz
- Carol Sloane: Carol Sloane Live at 30th Street
- Stanley Turrentine: Soul Shoutin'
- Kai Winding: Solo: Kai Winding

== Deaths ==
January

- 13 – Sonny Clark, American pianist (born 1931).
- 16 – Ike Quebec, American tenor saxophonist (born 1918).

February

- 6 – Specs Wright, American drummer (born 1927).
- 14 – Castor McCord, American saxophonist (born 1907).
- 16 – Jimmy Reynolds, American pianist (born 1904).
- 20 – Addison Farmer, American bassist (born 1928).
- 23 – June Clark, American trumpeter and cornetist (born 1900).
- 28 – Bobby Jaspar, Belgian saxophonist, flautist, and composer (born 1926).

March

- 10 – Irving Aaronson, American pianist and big band leader (born 1895).
- 17 – Lizzie Miles, Creole blues singer (born 1895).

April

- 3 – Gene Sedric, American clarinetist and tenor saxophonist (born 1907).
- 9 – Eddie Edwards, American trombonist (born 1891).
- 11 – Arvid Gram Paulsen, Norwegian saxophonist and trumpeter (born 1922).
- 12 – Herbie Nichols, American pianist and composer (born 1919).

May

- 24 – Elmore James, American guitarist (born 1918).

June

- 3 – Skinnay Ennis, American bandleader and singer (born 1907).
- 12 – Bob Scobey, American trumpeter (born 1916).

July

- 25 – John Adriano Acea, American jazz pianist (born 1917).
- 31 – Curtis Counce, American upright bassist (born 1926).

August

- 23 – Glen Gray, American saxophonist, Casa Loma Orchestra (born 1906).

September

- 20 – Pete Brown, American alto saxophonist and bandleader (born 1906).
- Sam Allen, American pianist (born 1909).

November

- 4 – Joe Gordon, American trumpeter (born 1928).
- 29 – Ernesto Lecuona, Cuban composer, pianist and bandleader (born 1895).

December

- 14
  - Dinah Washington, American singer (born 1924).
  - Lodewijk Parisius "Kid Dynamite", Surinamese-Dutch tenor saxophonist (born 1911).
- 22 – Roy Palmer, American trombonist (born 1892).
- Unknown date
- Jon Ballantyne, Canadian pianist and composer.
- Naftule Brandwein, Jewish clarinetist and influential klezmer musician (born 1884).

== Births ==
January

- 7 – Christine Tobin, Irish vocalist and composer.
- 17 – Cyrus Chestnut, American pianist, composer and producer.

February

- 2
  - Eva Cassidy, American singer and guitarist (died 1996).
  - Vigleik Storaas, Norwegian pianist.
- 5 – Jacqui Dankworth, British singer.

March

- 5 – Ralph Alessi, American trumpeters and composer.
- 18 – Yoko Kanno, Japanese composer, arranger, keyboarder, pianist, and accordionist.
- 23 – Nelson Faria, Brazilian guitarist.
- 24
  - Dave Douglas, American trumpeter and composer.
  - Eric Vloeimans, Dutch trumpeter.
- 30 – Ximo Tebar, Spanish guitarist and composer.

April

- 1 – Antoine Roney, American saxophonist.
- 4 – Benny Green, American pianist.
- 7 – Fredrik Lundin, Danish saxophonist, composer, and bandleader.
- 8 – Tine Asmundsen, Norwegian upright bassist.
- 17 – Peter Havlicek, Austrian kontragitarrist (viennese harp-guitar), guitarist, composer, and vocalist.
- 24 – Horacio "El Negro" Hernandez, Cuban drummer and percussionist.

May

- 2 – Eric Person, American saxophonist.
- 4 – Gerald Cleaver, American drummer.
- 9 – Ron Miles, American trumpeter, cornetist, and composer.
- 4 – Jack Cooper, American composer, arranger, multireedist, and music educator.
- 16 – Nikki Iles, English composer, pianist and accordion player.
- 27 – Gonzalo Rubalcaba, Cuban composer and pianist.
- 28 – Marc Antoine, French guitarist.

June

- 9 – Gilad Atzmon, British saxophonist and writer.
- 20 – Jeff Beal, American trumpeter, flugelhornist, keyboarder, and composer.
- 28 – Tierney Sutton, American singer.

July

- 5 – Russ Lorenson, American singer and actor.
- 23 – Renato Borghetti, Brazilian folk musician and composer.

August

- 7 – Marcus Roberts, American pianist.
- 10 – Christine Ott, French composer, pianist, vocalist, and multi-instrumentalist.
- 12
  - Karen Briggs, African-American violinist.
  - Nigel Mooney, Irish singer, guitarist, and songwriter.
- 23 – Stephanie Biddle, Canadian musician.
- 31 – Baard Slagsvold, Norwegian singer and multi-instrumentalist.

September

- 2 – Sherrie Maricle, American drummer.
- 6 – Thulla Christina Wamberg, Danish singer.

October

- 3 – Niels Lan Doky, Danish pianist and record producer.

November

- 1 – Martin Pizzarelli, American upright bassist.
- 2 – Jens Johansson, Swedish pianist and keyboarder.
- 8 – Russell Malone, American guitarist.
- 16 – Steve Argüelles, English drummer.
- 20 – Don Braden, American tenor saxophonist.
- 24
  - Scott Colley, American upright bassist and composer.
  - Yoron Israel, American drummer.
- 25
  - Anders Widmark, Swedish pianist and composer.
  - Holly Cole, Canadian singer.

December

- 10 – Ole Amund Gjersvik, Norwegian upright bassist.
- 14 – Dalia Faitelson, Israeli composer, vocalist, guitarist, and DJ DaFa.
- 29 – Dave McKean, English photographer, graphic designer, filmmaker, and pianist.

Unknown date

- Bill Wells, Scottish bassist, pianist, guitarist, and composer.
- Don Paterson, Scottish poet, writer, and musician.
- Gianni Lenoci, Italian pianist and composer.
- Torcuato Mariano, Argentinian-born American guitarist.

== See also ==
- 1960s in jazz
- List of years in jazz
- 1963 in music

== Bibliography ==
- The New Real Book, Volume I. Sher Music. 1988. ISBN 0-9614701-4-3.
- The New Real Book, Volume II. Sher Music. 1991. ISBN 0-9614701-7-8.
- The New Real Book, Volume III. Sher Music. 1995. ISBN 1-883217-30-X.
- The Real Book, Volume I (6th ed.). Hal Leonard. 2004. ISBN 0-634-06038-4.
- The Real Book, Volume II (2nd ed.). Hal Leonard. 2007. ISBN 978-1-4234-2452-9.
- The Real Book, Volume III (2nd ed.). Hal Leonard. 2006. ISBN 0-634-06136-4.
- The Real Jazz Book. Warner Bros. ISBN 978-91-85041-36-7.
- The Real Vocal Book, Volume I. Hal Leonard. 2006. ISBN 0-634-06080-5.
