= 1985 in jazz =

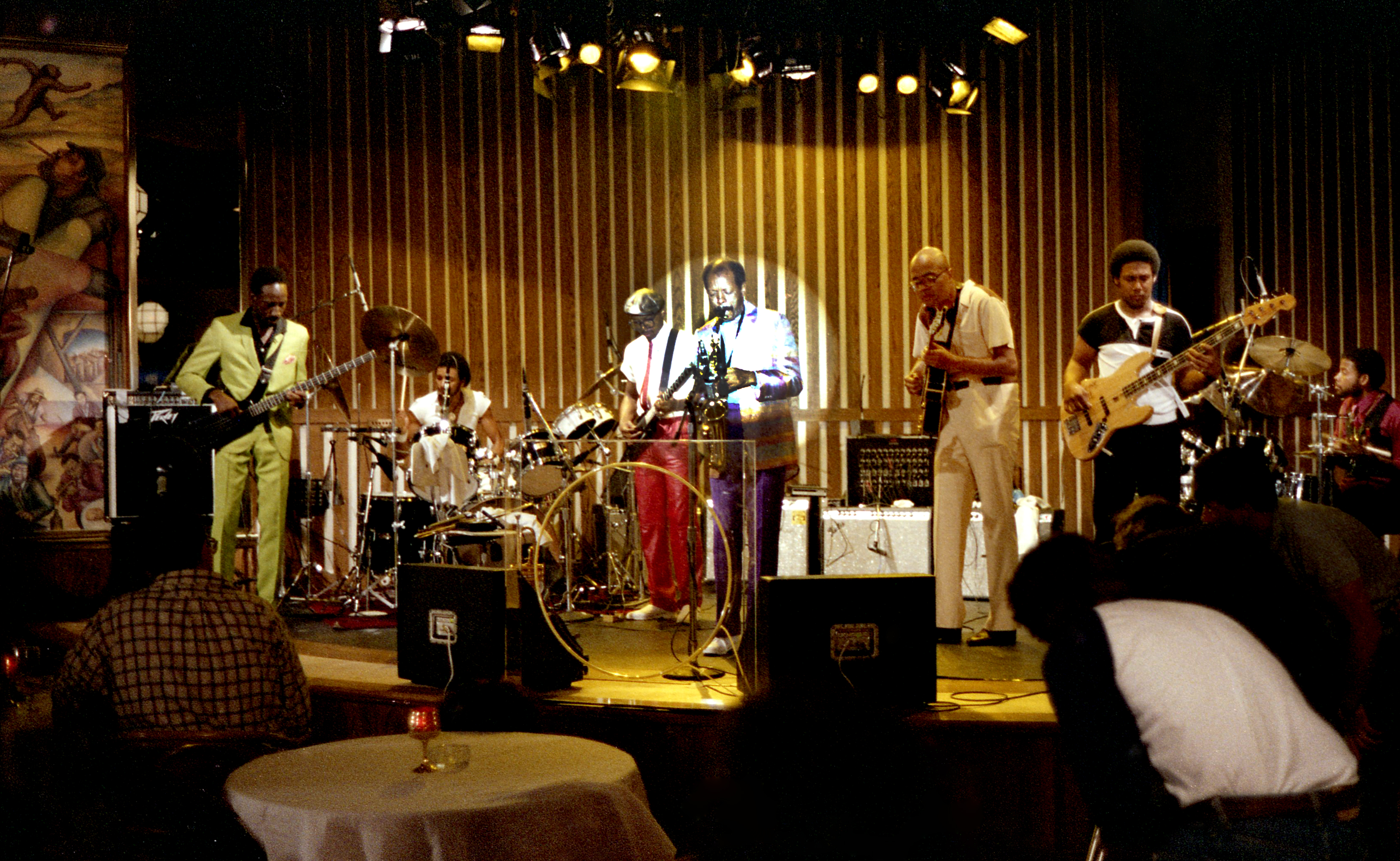
- Ornette Coleman's Prime Time at the Caravan of Dream in 1985
- Decade: 1980s in jazz
- Music: 1985 in music
- Standards: List of post-1950 jazz standards
- See also: 1984 in jazz – 1986 in jazz

This is a timeline documenting events of Jazz in the year 1985.

== Events ==
=== March ===
- 29 – The 12th Vossajazz started in Vossavangen, Norway (March 29 – 31).

=== May ===
- 24 – 14th Moers Festival started in Moers, Germany (May 24 – 27).
- 22 – 13th Nattjazz started in Bergen, Norway (May 22 – June 5).

=== June ===
- 28 – The 6th Montreal International Jazz Festival started in Montreal, Quebec, Canada (June 28 – July 7).

=== July ===
- 4 – The 19th Montreux Jazz Festival started in Montreux, Switzerland (July 4 – 20).
- 12 – The 10th North Sea Jazz Festival started in The Hague, Netherlands (July 12 – 14).

=== August ===
- 16 – The 2nd Brecon Jazz Festival started in Brecon, Wales (April 16 – 18).

=== September ===
- 20 – The 28th Monterey Jazz Festival started in Monterey, California (September 20 – 22).

== Album releases ==
- Ornette Coleman and Prime Time: Opening the Caravan of Dreams
- Abdullah Ibrahim: Water From an Ancient Well
- Butch Morris: Current Trends In Racism
- Bobby Previte: Bump The Renaissance
- George Russell: The African Game
- Rova Saxophone Quartet: The Crowd
- Lyle Mays: Lyle Mays
- David Liebman: The Loneliness Of A Long-Distance Runner
- James Newton: Water Mystery
- Hank Robertson: Transparency
- David Torn: Best Laid Plans
- Borbetomagus: Borbeto Jam
- Mark Nauseef: Wun Wun
- Kip Hanrahan: Vertical Currency
- Patrick O'Hearn: Ancient Dreams
- Don Pullen: The Sixth Sense
- John Carter: Castles of Ghana
- Gerry Hemingway: Outerbridge Crossing
- Leni Stern: Clairvoyant
- Marc Johnson: Bass Desires
- Terje Rypdal: Chaser
- Tom Harrell: Moon Alley
- Wynton Marsalis: Black Codes (From the Underground)
- Wynton Marsalis: J Mood
- Paul Winter: Canyon
- Tony Williams: Civilization
- Michael Mantler: Alien
- Herbie Hancock: Village Life
- The Manhattan Transfer: Vocalese
- Michael Franks: Skin Dive
- Ben Sidran: On the Cool Side
- John Hicks Trio: Inc. 1
- Hugh Masekela: Waiting for the Rain

== Deaths ==
January

- 7 – Johnny Guarnieri, American pianist (born 1917).
- 10 – Cie Frazier, American drummer (born 1904).
- 11 – Kenny Clare, English drummer (born 1929).
- 18 – Georgie Stoll, American musical director, conductor, composer, and violinist (born 1905).
- 26 – Kenny Clarke, American drummer and bandleader (born 1914).

February

- 22 – Frank Traynor, Australian trombonist and entrepreneur (born 1927).
- 27 – Ray Ellington, English singer, drummer, and bandleader (born 1916).

March

- 13 – Annette Hanshaw, American singer (born 1901).
- 23 – Zoot Sims, American saxophonist (born 1925).
- 30 – Shizuko Kasagi, Japanese singer (born 1914).

April

- 21 – Irving Mills, American music publisher, musician, lyricist, and jazz artist promoter (born 1894).

May

- 2 – Larry Clinton, American trumpeter, bandleader, and songwriter (born 1909).
- 24 – Joe Darensbourg, American clarinetist and saxophonist (born 1906).
- 27 – Skeeter Best, American guitarist (born 1914).

June

- 15 – David "Buck" Wheat, American bassist, songwriter and recording artist (born 1922).

July

- 1
  - Dick Vance, American trumpeter (born 1915).
  - Lonnie Hillyer, American trumpeter (born 1940).
- 4 – Chris Woods, American alto saxophonist (born 1925).
- 11 – George Duvivier, American upright bassist (born 1920).

August

- 1 – Sam Wooding, American pianist, arranger, and bandleader (born 1895).
- 11 – Nick Ceroli, American drummer (born 1939).
- 19 – Cedric Wallace, American upright bassist (born 1909).
- 30 – Philly Joe Jones, American drummer (born 1923).

September

- 3 – Jo Jones, American drummer (born 1911).
- 6
  - Johnny Desmond, American singer (born 1919).
  - Little Brother Montgomery, American pianist and singer (born 1906).
- 15 – Cootie Williams, American trumpeter (born 1911).
- 18 – Ed Lewis, American trumpeter (born 1909).
- 19 – Charlie Holmes, American alto jazz saxophonist of the swing era (born 1910).
- George Clarke, American tenor saxophonist (born 1911).

October

- 12 – Blind John Davis, African American, blues, jazz and boogie-woogie pianist and singer (born 1913).
- Nelson Boyd, American bassist (born 1928).

November

- 4 – Richard Williams, American trumpeter (born 1931).
- 12 – Dicky Wells, American trombonist (born 1907).
- 13 – Max Miller, American pianist and vibraphonist (born 1911).
- 24 – Big Joe Turner, American blues shouter (born 1911).

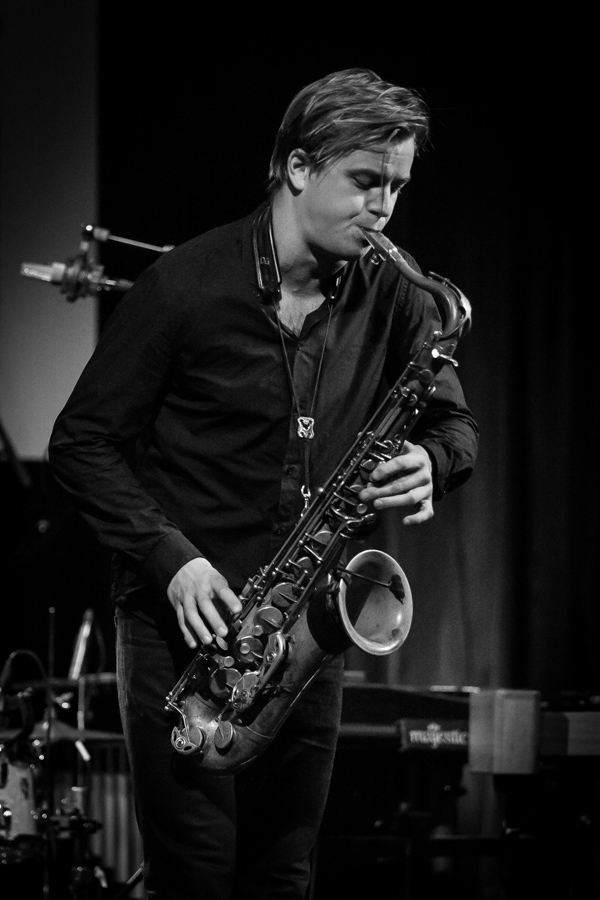
Marius Neset at Victoria during the 2015 Oslo Jazzfestival.

December

- 9
  - Calvin Jackson, American jazz pianist, composer, and bandleader (born 1919).
  - Charlie Munro, American reedist and flautist (born 1917).
- 28 – Benny Morton, American trombonist most associated with the swing genre (born 1907).

Unknown date

- Leon Prima, American trumpeter (born 1907).

== Births ==
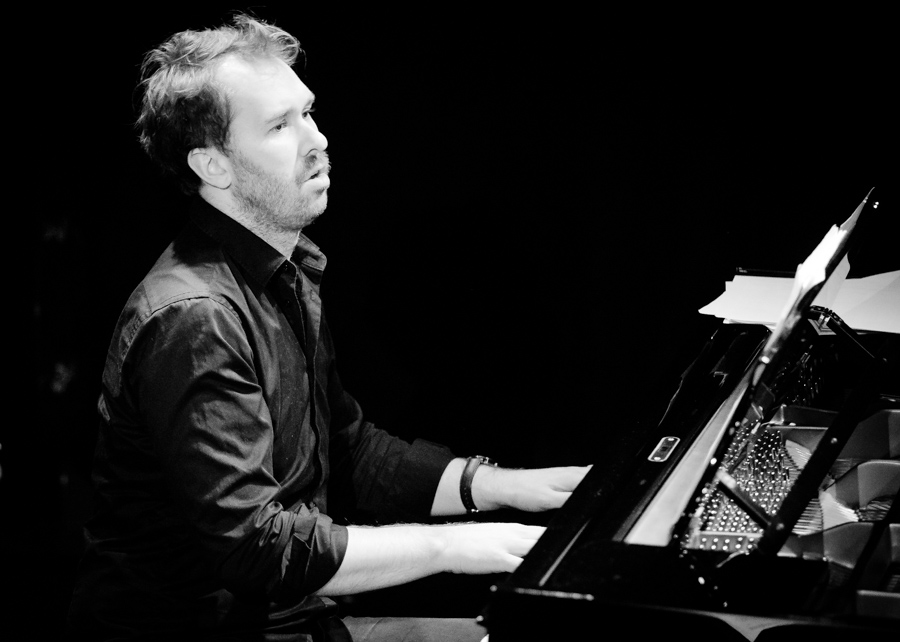
Eyolf Dale 2017 at Victoria, Nasjonal Jazzscene, Oslo.

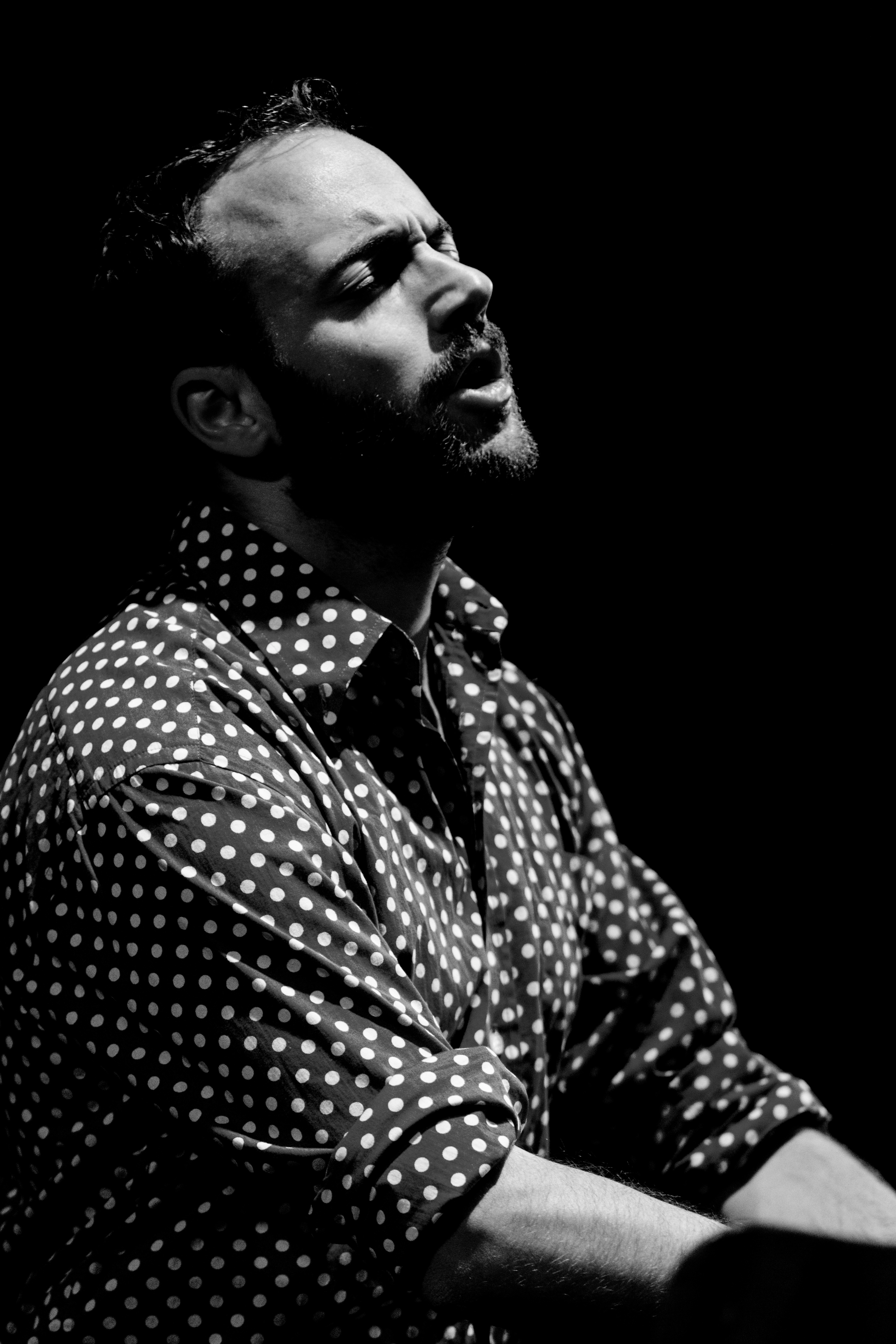
David Six at the 2014 Odessa Jazz Festival.

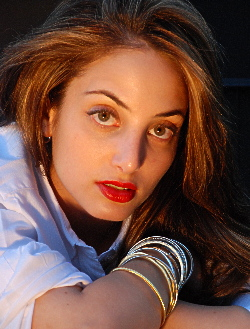
Alexa Ray Joel

January

- 2
  - André Roligheten, Norwegian saxophonist and composer.
  - Marius Neset, Norwegian saxophonist, composer, and bandleader.
- 11 – Newton Faulkner, English singer-songwriter and musician.
- 29 – Jon Rune Strøm, Norwegian upright bassist, and bass guitarist.

February

- 2 – Melody Gardot, American singer, writer and musician.
- 8 – Dario Chiazzolino, Italian guitarist and composer.
- 19 – Kristoffer Lo, Norwegian tubist, flugabonist, guitarist, and composer.

March

- 5 – Eyolf Dale, Norwegian pianist and composer.

May

- 3 – Louis Cato, American drummer, bassist, guitarist, singer, and composer.
- 14 – Tore Sandbakken, Norwegian drummer and composer.

June

- 12 – Olivia Trummer, German pianist, vocalist, and composer.
- 20 – Ellen Brekken, Norwegian upright bassist, guitar bassist, and tubist.

July

- 18 – Theo Croker, American trumpeter, singer, and bandleader from Leesburg, Florida.
- 22 – Camila Meza, Chilean singer-songwriter and guitarist.
- 25 – Tom Harrison, British alto saxophonist and flautist.
- 31 – Aaron Weinstein, American violinist and mandolinist.

August

- 14 – David Six, Austrian pianist, composer, and multi-instrumentalist.
- 22 – Kim Johannesen, Norwegian guitarist.
- 30 – Rachael Price, American vocalist from Hendersonville, Tennessee.

September

- 10 – Live Foyn Friis, Norwegian singer and composer.
- 22 – Aaron Diehl, American pianist.

October

- 7 – Alfredo Rodríguez, Cuban pianist and composer.
- 15 – Øystein Skar, Norwegian pianist and composer.
- 29 – Ximena Sariñana, Mexican singer-songwriter and actress

December

- 19 – Ine Hoem, Norwegian singer.
- 29 – Alexa Ray Joel, American singer, songwriter and pianist.

Unknown date

- Paul Carnegie-Jones, New Zealand pianist.
- Per Arne Ferner, Norwegian guitarist.

== See also ==
- 1980s in jazz
- List of years in jazz
- 1985 in music
