= George Clarke =

George Clarke may refer to:

== Arts and entertainment ==
=== Film, television, and theatre ===
- George Clarke (filmmaker), film director from Northern Ireland
- George Elliott Clarke (born 1960), Canadian poet and playwright
- George Clarke (television presenter) (born 1974), British architect and television presenter
- George Clarke (handyman), personality on the Late Show with David Letterman
- George Clarke (actor) (1840–1906), American stage actor
- George Downing Clarke (1859–1930), British-born stage and screen actor
- George Clarke (comedian) (1886–1946), English stage comedian
- George Clarke (internet personality) (born 1999), English YouTuber

=== Other arts ===
- George Elliott Clarke (born 1960), Canadian poet and playwright
- George Clarke (television presenter) (born 1974), British architect and television presenter
- George Somers Leigh Clarke (1822–1882), English architect
- George Clarke (singer), lead singer of Deafheaven
- George Clarke (jazz musician) (1911–1985), American jazz saxophonist
- George Clarke (sculptor) (1796–1842), English sculptor
- George Clarke (internet personality) (born 1999), English YouTuber

== Politics ==
=== North America ===
- George Clarke (governor) (1676–1760), colonial New York, 1736–1743
- George W. Clarke (Iowa politician) (1852–1936), governor of Iowa
- George W. Clarke (Newfoundland politician) (1910–2000), Newfoundland lawyer and politician
- George W. Clarke (Washington politician) (1906–2006), American politician in the state of Washington
- George Johnson Clarke (1857–1917), premier of New Brunswick
- George Clarke (Canadian politician) (1827–?), politician in Nova Scotia
- George J. F. Clarke (1774–1836), active in East Florida in the Second Spanish Period
- George L. Clarke (1813–1890), mayor of Providence, Rhode Island

=== Elsewhere ===
- George Clarke (British politician) (1661–1736), Secretary at War
- George Clarke (New Zealand pioneer) (1823–1913), pioneer and educationist
- George Clarke, 1st Baron Sydenham of Combe (1848–1933), British colonial administrator
- George Clarke (judge) (1798–1875), New Zealand missionary, teacher, public servant, politician and judge
- George Thomas Clarke (1853–1925), Australian local government politician

== Sport ==
- George Clarke (cricketer) (1869–1955), English cricketer
- George Clarke (footballer, born 1894) (1894–1960), footballer for Crewe Alexandra and Stoke
- George Clarke (footballer, born 1900) (1900–1977), English football player (Aston Villa, Crystal Palace, QPR)
- George Clarke (footballer, born 1921) (1921–2011), English football player (Ipswich Town)
- George Clarke (winger) (fl. 1908–1910), English professional association footballer who played as a winger

== In other fields ==
- George Clarke (1768–1835), New York landowner who commissioned the construction of Hyde Hall
- George Clarke (priest) (1793–1871), archdeacon of Antigua
- George Aubourne Clarke (died 1949), Scottish meteorologist
- George Clarke (prospector) (1846–1895), prospector in Queensland, Australia
- George Calvert Clarke (1814–1900), British Army officer
- George Frederick Clarke (1883–1974), New Brunswick author, historian and amateur archaeologist
- George Clarke (urban planner) (1932–2005), Australian town planner during the 1970s
- George Marshall Clarke, African American barber in Milwaukee, Wisconsin, lynched in 1861
- George Clarke (convict) (1806–1835), convict and bushranger known as "The Barber"
- George S. Clarke (1890–1968), colonel in the US Army

== See also ==
- George Clark (disambiguation)
- George Clerk (disambiguation)
