= 1911 in jazz =

- Decade: 1910s in jazz
- Music: 1911 in music
- Standards: List of pre-1920 jazz standards
- See also: 1910 in jazz – 1912 in jazz

This is a timeline documenting events of Jazz in the year 1911.

== Events ==
=== March ===
- 18 – The Irving Berlin album Alexander's Ragtime Band was released.

=== Unknown date ===
- The composer and pianist Scott Joplin published his opera Treemonisha.

== Births ==
January

- 25 – Truck Parham, American upright bassist (died 2002).
- 30
  - Roy Eldridge, American jazz trumpeter (died 1989).
  - Frank Weir, British orchestra leader and saxophonist (died 1981).

March

- 7 — Louis Cottrell Jr., American clarinetist and tenor saxophonist (died 1978).
- 10 – Pete Clarke, British saxophonist and clarinetist (died 1975).
- 16 – Harper Goff, Afro-Cuban clarinetist, saxophonist, and trumpeter (died 1993).
- 31 – Freddie Green, American guitarist (died 1987).

April

- 2 — Cag Cagnolatti, American trumpeter (died 1983).
- 12 – Tullio Mobiglia, Italian saxophonist and bandleader (died 1991).
- 16 – Alton Purnell, American pianist (died 1987).
- 21
  - John G. Blowers Jr. or Johnny Blowers, American drummer (died 2006).
  - Zilas Görling, Swedish saxophonist (died 1960).
- 28
  - Mario Bauza, American artist, musician, and actor (died 1993).
  - Norma Teagarden, American pianist (died 1996).

May

- 8 — Robert Johnson, American guitarist, singer, and composer (died 1938).
- 13 – Billy Munn, British jazz pianist and arranger (died 2000).
- 13 – Maxine Sullivan, American vocalist and performer (died 1987).
- 18 – Big Joe Turner, American blues shouter (died 1985).

July

- 7 — Charles Redland, Swedish saxophonist, bandleader, and composer (died 1994).
- 10 – Cootie Williams, American trumpeter (died 1985).
- 17 – Lionel Ferbos, American trumpeter (died 2014).
- 23 – Lodewijk Parisius "Kid Dynamite", Surinamese-Dutch tenor saxophonist (died 1963).

August

- 20 – Billy Amstell, British reedist (died 2005).
- 28 – George Clarke, American tenor saxophonist (died 1985).

September

- 30 – Clare Deniz, British pianist (died 2002).

October

- 7 — Jo Jones, American drummer (died 1985).
- 8 — Karel Vlach, Czech musician, orchestra conductor, and arranger (died 1986).
- 26 – Mahalia Jackson, American singer (died 1972).

November

- 11 – Dick Wilson, American jazz tenor saxophonist (died 1941).
- 12 – Buck Clayton, American trumpeter (died 1991).
- 17 – Max Miller, American pianist and vibraphonist (died 1985).
- 21 – Alvin Burroughs, American drummer (died 1950).
- 22 – Ernie Caceres, American saxophonist (died 1971).

December

- 14 – Spike Jones, American musician and bandleader (died 1965).
- 15 – Stan Kenton, American pianist, composer, arranger, and band leader (died 1979).
- 19 – Lu Watters, American trumpeter and band leader, Yerba Buena Jazz Band (died 1989).

Unknown date

- Aldo Rossi, Italian reedist and bandleader (died 1980).
