= George Clark =

George Clark may refer to:

== Politicians ==
- Sir George Clark, 1st Baronet (1861–1935), businessman and politician in Northern Ireland
- Sir George Clark, 2nd Baronet (1883–1950)
- Sir George Clark, 3rd Baronet (1914–1991), unionist politician and Orangeman
- George Clark (New Orleans), mayor of New Orleans, 1866
- George Clark (Queensland politician) (1834–1907), member of the Legislative Assembly of Queensland for Warwick
- George Daniel Clark (1848–1933), Australian politician
- George T. Clark (1837–1888), American politician
- George Washington Clark (1834–1898), mayor of Charleston, South Carolina

== Sportsmen ==
- George Clark (baseball) (1891–1940), baseball player
- George Clark (American football coach) (1894–1972), "Potsy", American football coach
- George Clark (cricketer), New Zealand cricketer
- George Clark (racing driver) (1890–1978), American racecar driver
- George Clark (Australian footballer) (1898–1978), Australian footballer

== Academics ==
- George Bassett Clark (1827–1891), American instrument maker and astronomer
- George Clark (historian) (1890–1979), British historian
- George W. Clark (1928–2023), American astronomer

== Others ==
- George Rogers Clark (1752–1818), American Revolutionary War military leader
- George Ramsey Clark (1857–1945), United States Navy admiral
- George Clark (cartoonist) (1902–1981), creator of The Neighbors
- George Kitson Clark (1900–1975), English historian
- George H. Clark (1872–1943), Republican lawyer and judge from Ohio
- George M. Clark (1875–1951), American jurist
- George Thomas Clark (1809–1898), British engineer and antiquary
- George Clark (activist) (1926–20??), a founding member of the 'Committee of 100' and housing activist in Notting Hill
- George Clark (producer) (1888–1946), British film producer
- George Aitken Clark (1823–1873), Scottish manufacturer and benefactor
- George Clark (British Army officer) (1892–1948), senior British Army officer
- George Makana Clark, Zimbabwean writer
- George Clark (priest) (1810–1874), archdeacon of St David's

== See also ==
- George Clark & NEM, a British marine engineering business
- George Clarke (disambiguation)
- George Clerk (disambiguation)
