= Amstell =

Amstell is a surname. Notable people with the surname include:

- Billy Amstell (1911–2005), British jazz reedist
- Simon Amstell (born 1979), British comedian, writer, and director
