= George Somers Clarke =

George Somers Clarke may refer to:

- George Somers Leigh Clarke (1822–1882), English architect
- Somers Clarke (1841–1926), English architect and Egyptologist

== See also ==
- George Clarke (disambiguation)
- George Somers (disambiguation)
