= George Somers (disambiguation) =

George Somers was an English naval hero.

George Somers may also refer to:

- George Somers (American football) (1915–1964), American football offensive lineman and placekicker
- George Somers, candidate for Miramichi

== See also ==
- George Summers (disambiguation)
- George Somers Clarke (disambiguation)
- George Sommer, Peruvian footballer
