= George Summers =

George Summers may refer to:

- George Summers (cricketer) (1844–1870), English cricketer who played for Nottinghamshire
- George W. Summers (1804–1868), American politician, attorney and jurist from Virginia
- George Summers (cyclist), British Olympic cyclist
- George Summers (footballer) (born 1941), Scottish football forward, manager and coach
- George Summers (racer) in New England Auto Racers Hall of Fame

== See also ==
- George Somers (disambiguation)
