= George Clerk =

George Clerk may refer to:

- Sir George Clerk, 6th Baronet (1787–1867), British politician
- Sir George Russell Clerk (1800–1889), civil servant in British India
- George Clerk (diplomat) (1874–1951), British diplomat
- George C. Clerk (1931–2019), Ghanaian botanist and plant pathologist

== See also ==
- George Clerk-Maxwell (1715–1784), Scottish landowner
- George Clarke (disambiguation)
- George Clark (disambiguation)
- Clerk (disambiguation)
