= Tocororo (album) =

Studio album by Alfredo Rodríguez
- Released: March 4, 2016
- Genre: Jazz
- Length: 47:35
- Label: Mack Avenue Records

Professional ratings
Review scores
Source	Rating
The Irish Times	4/5 stars

Tocororo is a jazz album by Alfredo Rodríguez, the third under his leadership. Named after a Cuban bird that dies of sadness in captivity, the theme of the album is mourning and celebrating lost beauty after Rodríguez' leaving Cuba and living in USA for seven years.

== Track listing ==
No.	Title	Music	Length
1.	"Chan Chan"	Francisco Repilado	2:09
2.	"Yemayá"	Alfredo Rodriguez	3:42
3.	"Raíces (Roots)"	Alfredo Rodriguez	4:28
4.	"Gitanerías"	Ernesto Lecuona	3:58
5.	"Tocororo"	Alfredo Rodriguez	5:03
6.	"Venga la Esperanza"	Silvio Rodríguez	4:25
7.	"Ay, Mamá Inés"	Eliseo Grenet	3:14
8.	"Sabanas Blancas"	Gerardo Alfonso Morejón	4:06
9.	"Jesu, Joy of Man's Desiring"	Johann Sebastian Bach; Traditional	3:15
10.	"Kaleidoscope"	Alfredo Rodriguez	3:05
11.	"Adiós Nonino"	Georges Coulonges; Simon Helpert; Albert Lasry; Astor Piazzolla; Ben Soussan	4:08
12.	"Meteorite"	Alfredo Rodriguez	3:24
13.	"Ay, Mamá Inés [Remix]"	Eliseo Grenet	2:38
Total length:			47:35

== Personnel ==
- Johann Sebastian Bach – Composer
- Florent Bobet – Engineer
- Richard Bona – Bass (Electric), Featured Artist, Vocals
- Joe Bozzie – Assistant Engineer
- Ariel Bringuez – Clarinet, Flute, Sax (Soprano), Sax (Tenor)
- Omar Carrascosa – Assistant Engineer
- Georges Coulonges – Composer
- Ganavya Doraiswamy – Featured Artist, Vocals
- Maria Ehrenreich – Creative Services Coordinator, Producer
- Adam Fell – Executive Producer
- Eliseo Grenet – Composer
- Bernie Grundman – Mastering Engineer
- Helik Hadar – Engineer
- Simon Helpert – Composer
- Natalie Hernandez – Associate Producer
- Ibeyi – Featured Artist, Vocals
- Quincy Jones – Executive Producer, Producer
- Randall Kennedy – Creative Director
- Albert Lasry – Composer
- Ernesto Lecuona – Composer
- Brock Lefferts – Art Direction, Design
- Antonio Lizana – Arranger, Featured Artist, Vocals
- Ibrahim Maalouf – Featured Artist, Trumpet
- José Martí – Liner Notes
- Gerardo Alfonso Morejón – Composer
- Michael Olivera – Arranger, Drums, Percussion
- Paulo Pulido Valente – Engineer
- Astor Piazzolla – Composer
- Al Pryor – Executive Vice President
- Francisco Repilado – Composer
- Alfredo Rodríguez – Arranger, Composer, Melodion, Piano, Primary Artist, Producer, Synthesizer, Vocals
- Silvio Rodríguez – Composer
- Reiner Elizarde Ruano – Bass (Acoustic)
- Ben Soussan – Composer
- Gretchen Valade – Executive Producer
- Will Wakefield – Production Manager
- Anna Webber – Photography
