= George Clark (cricketer) =

New Zealand cricketer

Personal information
- Full name: George H Clark

Domestic team information
- Years: Team
- 1872/73–1879/80: Otago
- Source: ESPNcricinfo, 7 May 2016

George H Clark was a New Zealand cricketer. He played eight first-class matches for Otago between the 1872–73 and 1879–80 seasons and later stood as an umpire in first-class matches.

Clark made his first-class debut for Otago in February 1873, playing against Canterbury at Hagley Oval in Christchurch, the only first-class match played in the country during the season. He played against the same team in seven of his eight first-class matches, the other appearance coming against Auckland in November 1873. Apart from the match against Canterbury in January 1875, he played in all of Otago's first-class matches during the period in which he played, scoring 125 first-class runs with a highest score of 30. He also played for the Otago team in non-first-class matches against James Lillywhite's touring English team in March 1877 and touring Australian teams in both January 1878 and January 1881.
