= Jimmy Reynolds =

American jazz musician

James Russel Reynolds (August 5, 1904 – February 16, 1963) was an American jazz pianist.

Reynolds led his own band at the Hollywood Cafe in New York City in the 1930s and 1940s, though he rarely recorded with this ensemble. He also played as a sideman with Kaiser Marshall (1935) and recorded with Red Allen, Jabbo Smith (1938), Hot Lips Page (1938–40, on sides for Decca Records), Bill Dillard (1947), and Larry Darnell (1952). He played with Harry Dial and Lester Boone in the 1960s.
