= Peter Havlicek =

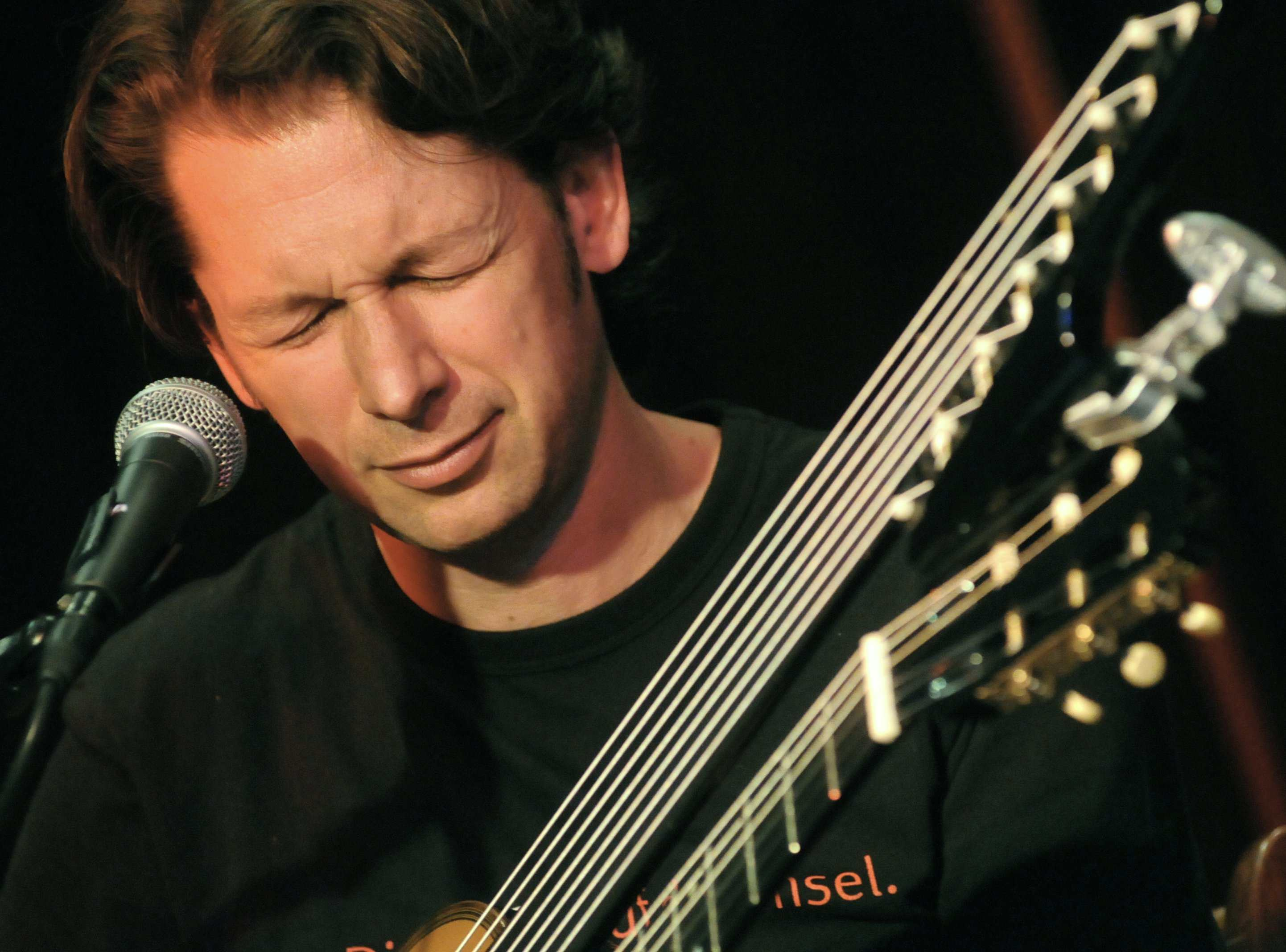

Background information
- Born: 17 April 1963 (age 62)
- Origin: Vienna, Austria
- Genres: Jazz
- Occupation(s): Instrumentalist, singer, composer
- Instrument(s): Guitar, vocals, kontragitarre
- Website: peterhavlicek.at/p/de

Peter Havlicek (born 17 April 1963 in Vienna) is an Austrian musician - Kontragitarre (viennese harp-guitar), jazz guitar, composition, vocals.

== Life and career ==
Havlicek studied classical and jazz guitar with Harry Pepl at the University of Music and Dramatic Arts Graz. He obtained the diploma for artistic jazz guitar in 1991. During his studies he founded the duo Steinberg and Havlicek together with the singer Traude Holzer. Havlicek also participated in founding the Quartett Neue Wiener Concert Schrammeln in 1994 and the group Des Ano in 2000.

Peter Havlicek is dedicated to the renewal of the Viennese music and its combination with classic and jazz since the beginning of his musical career.

Peter Havlicek appeared at the Burgtheater, the Volksoper, the Volkstheater and the Theater in der Josefstadt in Vienna, and with Robert Meyer, Karlheinz Hackl, André Heller, Michael Heltau, Karl Markovic, Wolfgang Böck, Hansi Lang, Ed Thigpen, Benny Bailey, Karl Hodina, Trude Mally, Karl Ferdinand Kratzl, Bodo Hell and many others.

== Diskografie ==
Peter Havlicek

- Schrammel und die Jazz, 2013 non food factory

assisted by: Neue Wiener Concert Schrammeln, Karl Hodina, Steinberg und Havlicek, zwiefoch +, Agnes Palmisano, Roland Sulzer, Agnes Heginger, Andreas Schreiber, Trio Stippich - Havlicek, Michael Schober, Paul Skrepek jr.

Karl Hodina - Tini Kainrath - Peter Havlicek

- Geborgene Schätze, 2017 non food factory

Steinberg und Havlicek

- steinberg und havlicek 1997 kos rec.
- unhamlich leicht 2000 non food factory
- HIMMEL UND HÖLL, 2002 non food factory
- Alles Gute, 2010 non food factory

Neue Wiener Concert Schrammeln

- Neue Wiener Concert Schrammeln 1997 kos rec.
- Vitamin Qu 1999 kos rec.
- Kronprinz Rudolf 2000 non food factory
- TANZ, 2001 Preiser Records
- Auf der Rennbahn, 2004 Preiser Records
- ZAMONA, 2007 non food factory
- KRONJUWELEN, 2012 non food factory

Robert Meyer und die Neuen Wiener Concert Schrammeln

- Tannhäuser in 80 Minuten, 2008 Phoenix Edition (DVD)

Otto Brusatti and the Neuen Wiener Concert Schrammeln

- Der Herr Karl, 2008 Astormedia

DES ANO

- Rafnschdecha, 2001 Preiser Records
- paradies, 2002 Preiser Records
- kleiner mann, 2008 non food factory
- film noir, 2009 ORF

Agnes Palmisano, Roland Sulzer, Peter Havlicek

- Wienerley, 2003 Preiser Records
- WIENER HALBWELTEN, Hinter-, Unter- und Abgründe des Wiener Liedes, 2005 non food factory
- Die wahre Liebe, 2012 non food factory

Zwiefoch+

- 3 für Weihnachten und eins für Silvester, 2006 non food factory

Palmina Waters

- wheels of time 2000 palmenreich prod.

Adi Hirschal & Wolfgang Böck

- Schwoazze Luft strizzihimmelfahrt, 2000 BMG Ariola

== Literatur ==
- Clemens Fabry: Neue Wiener Concert Schrammeln
- Peter Havlicek: Schrammel und die Jazz, 12 Kompositionen, Notenbuch 52 Seiten
