= David Six (musician) =

Austrian classical pianist

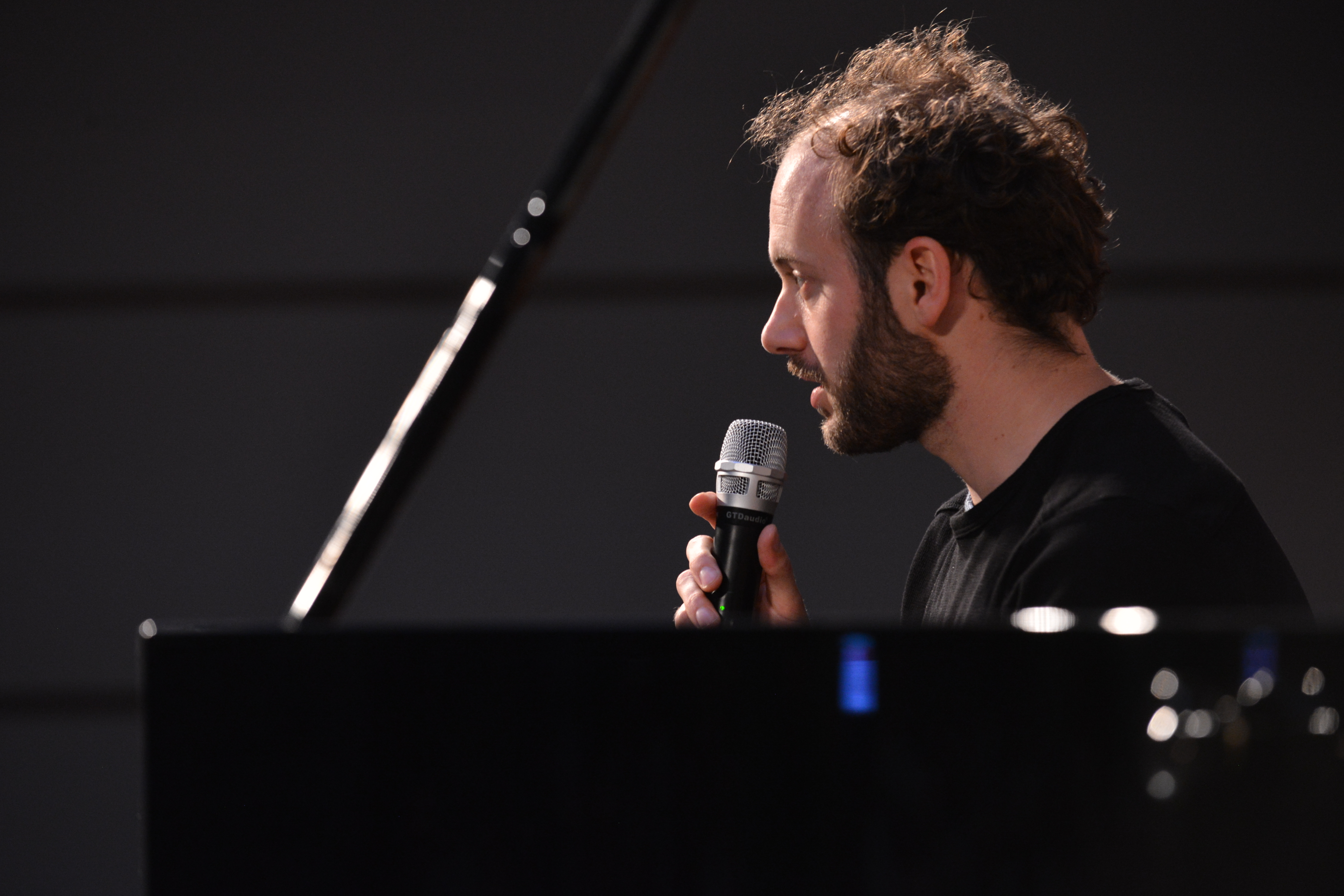

Background information
- Born: David Six; 14 August 1985 (age 41); Vöcklabruck, Austria
- Genres: Jazz, Contemporary, Classical music, Carnatic
- Occupations: Pianist, Composer, Arranger,
- Instruments: Piano, Mridangam, Tabla
- Labels: Listen Closely, Traumton, Freifeld, Medium Theater
- Website: davidsix.com

David Six (born 14 August 1985) is a pianist, composer and multi-instrumentalist from Austria. He is best known for his work as a solo artist and bandleader although he is active in many other projects including the improvising collective Radikalinsky or the contemporary music ensemble Stargaze with conductor André de Ridder.

== Music career ==
In 2014 Six released several albums under his own name: A solo record titled In The Rosewood Forrest on Freifeld Tontraeger, a live album with his quintet David Six' Matador featuring Mira Lu Kovacs, Andrej Prozorov, Walter Singer and Christian Grobauer and also a duo record with vocalist Mira Lu Kovacs.

In 2012 Six released the Debut album of the band Memplex called Souvenir on Listenclosely Records.

He has also recorded and or performed with Mira Lu Kovacs, Bill Frisell, Laura Winkler, Angizia, Shara Worden, Manickam Yogeswaran, Stargaze, Aart Strootman, Daníel Böðvarsson, Duško Gojković, Matthias Ruppnig, Wanja Slavin, Peter Herbert, Morris Kliphuis, Richard Reed Parry (Arcade Fire), Ilya Alabuzhev, Mario Rom, Alexi Murdoch and Alois Eberl among others.

Six has also performed for modern dance with the Dance Coomunication Lab and composed for film, with the award-winning animated short Zwischenwelten by Tamara König and the feature film Unter Umständen by Andreas Kurz.

== Active Bands ==
- David Six' Matador
- Memplex
- Stargaze Orchestra
- Mira Lu Kovacs & David Six
- Laura Winkler's Wabi Sabi Orchestra

== Past Projects/Collaborators ==
- Angizia
- Rubato Film

== Discography ==
=== As leader ===
- Dach – Radio Liberty (2015 / Listen Closely Records)
- Solo Piano – In The Rosewood Forrest (2014 / Freifeld Tontraeger)
- David Six' Matador – Graz Live (2014 / Listen Closely)
- Mira Lu Kovacs & David Six – Scham & Schande (2014 / Listen Closely)
- Niki Dolp's Memplex – Souvenir (2012 / Listen Closely)

=== other ===
- Stargaze/Greg Saunier – Deerhoof Chamber Variations (2015 / Transgressive Records London)
- Laura Winkler's Wabi Sabi Orchestra – Paperclips (2014 / Traumton)
- Angizia – Des Winters Finsterer Gesell (2013 / Medium Theater)
- Angizia – Kokon (2011 / Medium Theater)
