= George Clarke (cricketer) =

English cricketer

Personal information
- Full name: George William Clarke
- Born: 10 April 1869; Northampton, Northamptonshire, England
- Died: 26 August 1955 (aged 86); Northampton, Northamptonshire, England
- Batting: Unknown
- Bowling: Unknown

Domestic team information
- Years: Team
- 1908: Northamptonshire

Career statistics
Competition	First-class
Matches	1
Runs scored	0
Batting average	0.00
100s/50s	–/–
Top score	0
Balls bowled	75
Wickets	2
Bowling average	29.00
5 wickets in innings	–
10 wickets in match	–
Best bowling	2/58
Catches/stumpings	1/–
- Source: Cricinfo, 17 November 2011

George William Clarke (10 April 1869 – 26 August 1955) was an English cricketer. Clarke's batting and bowling styles are unknown. He was born at Northampton, Northamptonshire.

Clarke made a single first-class appearance for Northamptonshire against Kent in the 1908 County Championship. In Northamptonshire's first-innings he was run out for a duck, while in their second-innings he was dismissed for the same score by Punter Humphreys. With the ball, Clarke took the wickets of Frank Woolley and Arthur Fielder.

He died at the town of his birth on 26 August 1955.
