= Paul Carnegie-Jones =

New Zealand pianist (born 1985)

Paul Carnegie-Jones (born 1985) is a New Zealand pianist. Since 2008 he has been a concert accompanist and music director for Russian-born multi-platinum artist Yulia MacLean.

== Discography ==
Year	Album details
2010	Yulia 2010 Live Concert Series: Live in Concert at Mills Reef: Roles: Pianist.; Released: August, 2010.; Label: Oikos Music.; Formats: CD, digital download.

Year	Album details
2010	Yulia 2010 Live Concert Series: Live at Mill Bay Haven: Roles: Pianist.; Released: December, 2010.; Label: Oikos Music.; Formats: CD, digital download.

Year	Album details
2010	Yulia 2010 Live Concert Series: Enchanted Song: Roles: Pianist.; Released: December, 2010.; Label: Oikos Music.; Formats: CD, digital download.

Year	Album details
2010	Yulia 2010 Live Concert Series: Live at Ascension Wine Estate: Roles: Pianist.; Released: December, 2010.; Label: Oikos Music.; Formats: CD, digital download.
