= George Clarke (comedian) =

English comedian

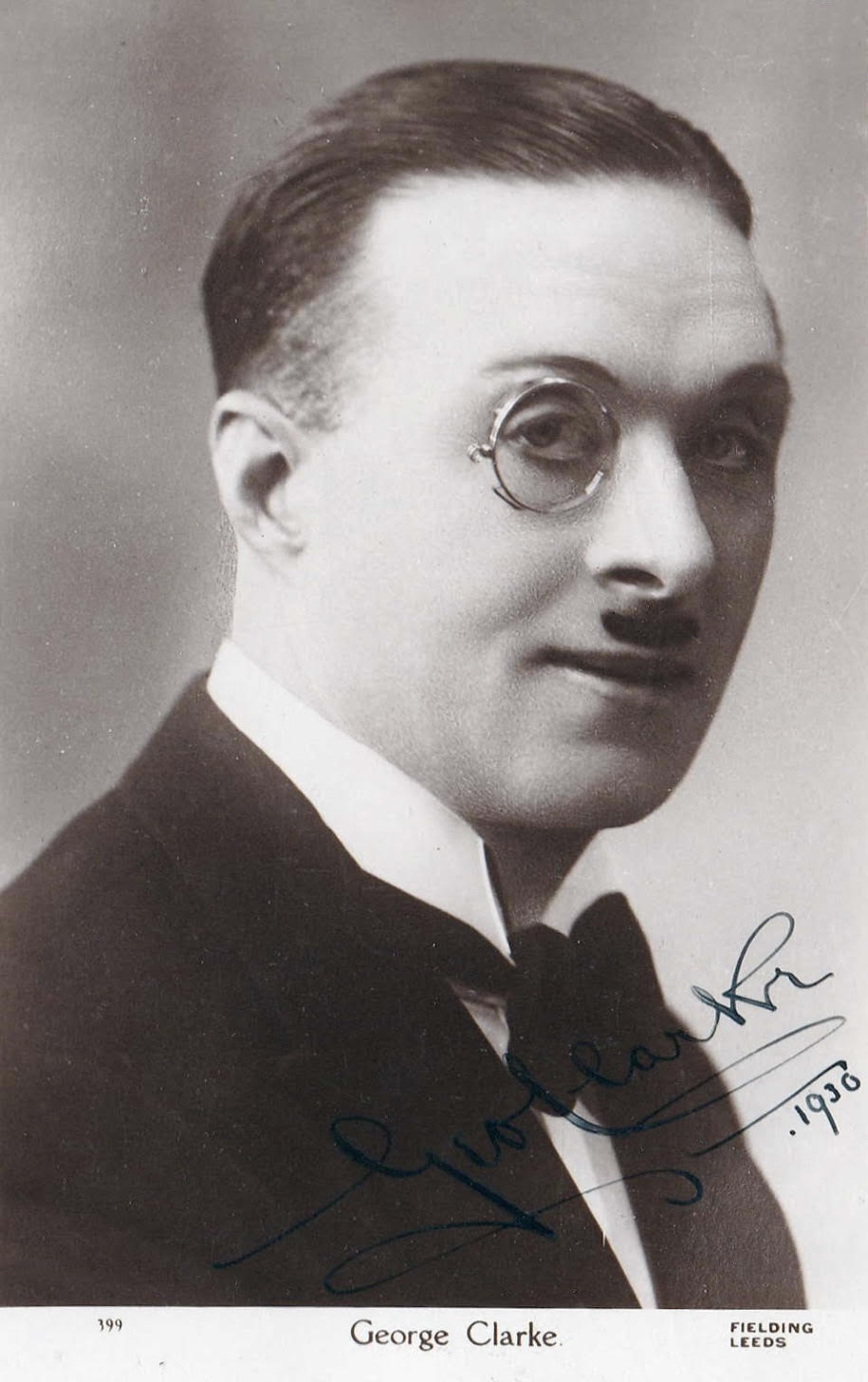
- Autographed publicity photograph of George Clarke (1930).
- Born: George Henry Broome; 11 April 1886; Bromley, Kent, England
- Died: 21 December 1946 (aged 60); Maidenhead, Berkshire
- Occupation: Comedian

George Clarke, born George Henry Broome (11 April 1886 – 21 December 1946) was an English comedian, prominent in music halls and musical revues from the 1910s to the mid-1940s. He began his career as child performer with his father, performing comic patter and dances. After his father's retirement from the stage in 1910 Clarke performed with another comedian, with whom he toured Australia and New Zealand in late 1911 and early 1912. Throughout the years of World War I into the 1920s, Clarke performed in revues in provincial and London theatres, many of them productions by the revue and vaudeville promoter Harry Day. He continued to perform until the mid-1940s in various theatrical productions, including three separate Royal Command Performances. Clarke played the lead roles in two films, performed in New York and toured in South Africa (on three occasions).

George Clarke's signature on-stage persona throughout his career was that of the 'dude comedian', impeccably dressed, often with a monocle and top hat, and delivering his comedic patter in an exaggerated upper-class accent. By the late-1920s Clarke had developed a comedy routine which involved him driving an Austin Seven car on stage, skilfully manoeuvred for dramatic and comedic effect. His car routine became Clarke's best-known comedy sketch, incorporated into a number of productions including Royal Command performances, a theatrical production in New York and a short film made in 1930.

== Biography ==
=== Early life ===
George Henry Broome was born on 11 April 1886 at Bromley or Poplar (adjoining districts in inner-city East London), England, the son of George Thomas Broome and Selena (née Hewett). His father was an entertainer who had adopted the stage-name of 'George Clarke'. Young George began his career in about 1893-4 as a child performer alongside his father, appearing as "patter comedians and dancers" in British music halls and billed as 'George Clarke and His Half'. The young boy possibly made his stage debut at the Albert Hall Music Hall in 1894. George's mother, Selina Broome, died in March 1901 at Bethnal Green in London.

=== A dude comedian ===
Later, as George grew to adulthood, the father-and-son partnership was billed as 'Clarke and Clements'. In 1910 George's father retired from the stage to become a publican and George (junior) took on the stage-name of 'George Clarke' and adopted the on-stage persona of a 'dude comedian'. The 'dude comedian' was a popular on-stage persona in music hall tradition, a working-class send-up of the upper classes, embodied as the well-dressed toff with monocle and top hat who indulged in routines of verbal nonsense. In a summary of his career published in The Performer magazine in 1946, it was said of Clarke: "He was a master in the art of giving full rein to the most priceless verbal inanities, was always impeccably attired on the stage, and with his monocle typified the 'silly ass' character so vastly enjoyed by the average man in the street".

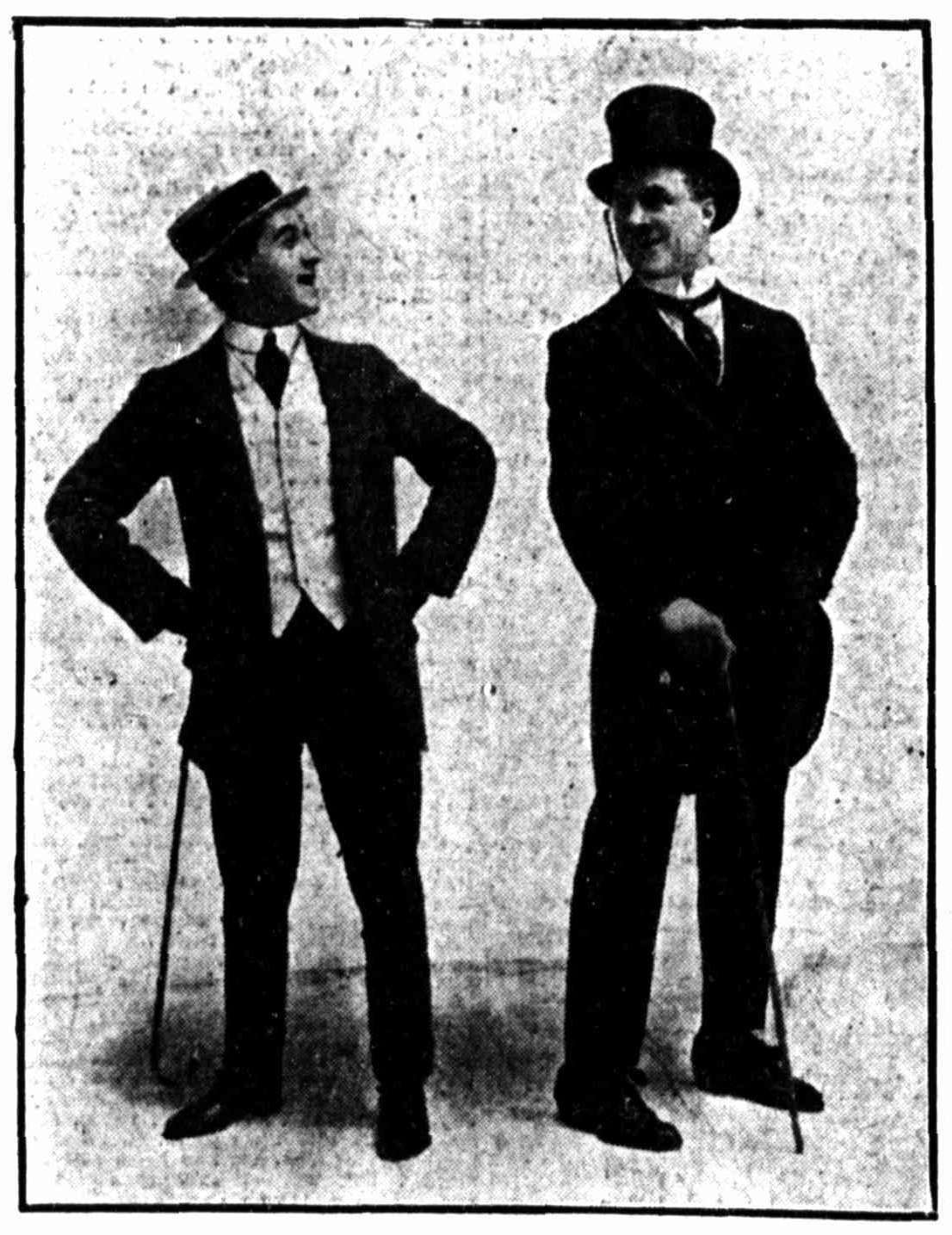
Clarke and Mostol in their performance personas as dude comedians.

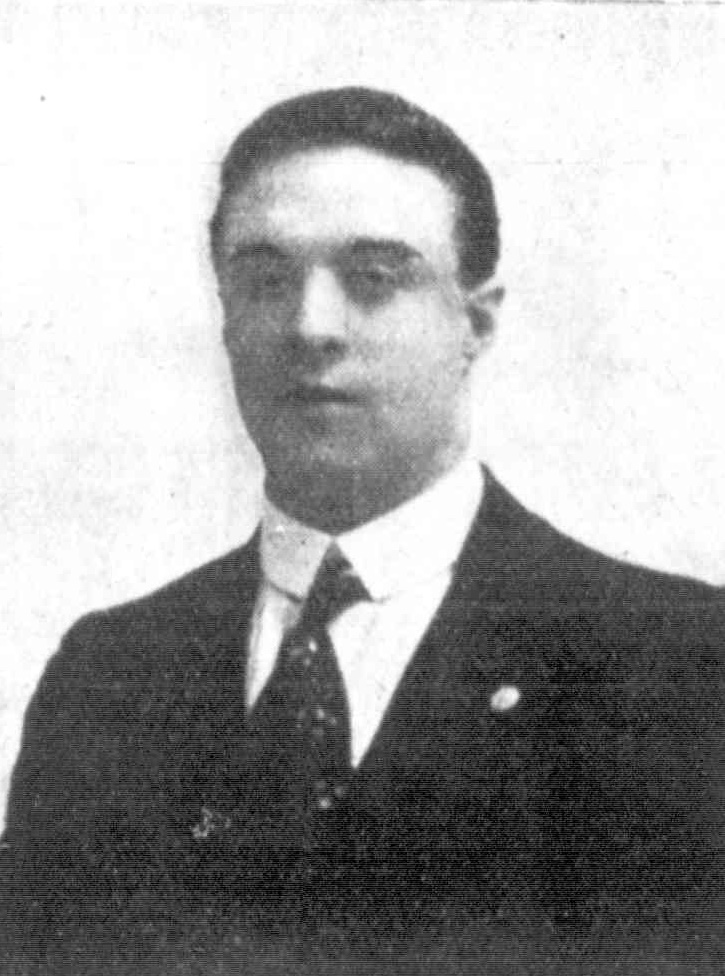
Photograph of George Clarke, published in 1911.

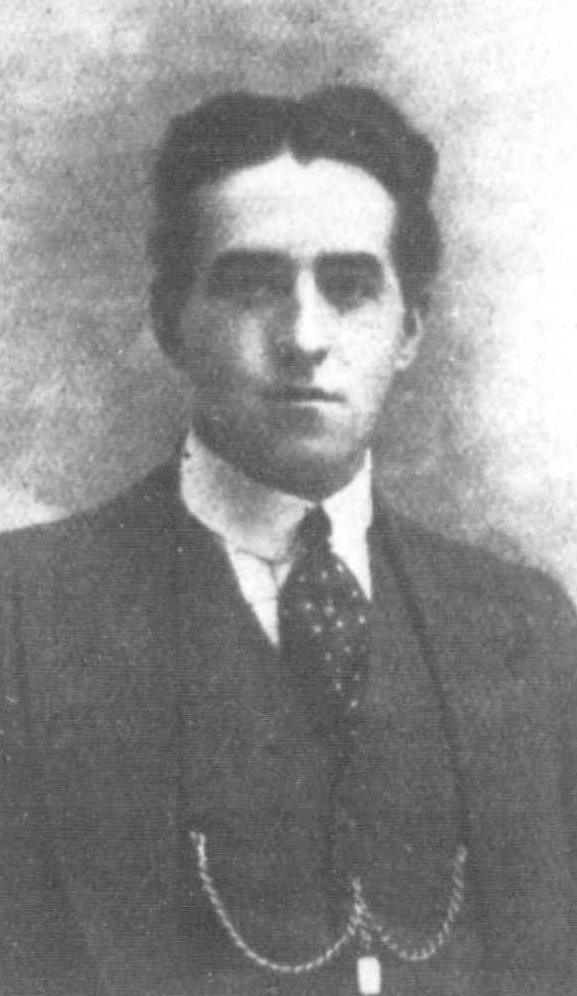
Clarke's partner during the tour of Australia, Tom Mostol (Daniel Price).

After his father retired from the stage Clarke teamed up with another comedian named Harold Price, who used the stage-name of 'Tom Mostol'. The two were billed as 'Clarke and Mostol', described as "fine patter comedians and dancers". Within a short period of time they had established themselves, performing in British music halls and variety shows. In early 1911 Clarke and Mostol were engaged for a tour of Australia and New Zealand by the theatrical entrepreneur Harry Rickards, who had established a circuit of touring vaudeville acts in Australia, involving theatres he both owned and leased, known as the 'Tivoli circuit'. Rickard visited England each year for the purpose of visiting music halls to identify and engage acts for the Australian variety stage.

George Clarke married Isabelle Markey at Lambeth on 21 June 1911, a week before his departure for Australia. Isabelle was an actress who used the stage-name 'Mamie Watson'.^{[A]}

=== Australasian tour ===
George Clarke and Tom Mostol arrived at Adelaide from London aboard the steamer R.M.S. Mongolia and made their Australian debut on 5 August 1911 at Adelaide's Tivoli Theatre. A reviewer for The Bulletin commented that Clarke and Mostol "have nothing new to show, but their step-dancing, single or double, is very good, and their cross-talk amusing". The writer gave an example of their comedic patter: "I planted a dead cat in my garden, and up came – a sanitary inspector". After a fortnight in Adelaide the two comedians travelled to Sydney and made their first appearance at the Tivoli Theatre in Sydney on 19 August. A reviewer for a Sydney newspaper described their act: "Made up as dudes, they succeeded with their comedy dances and clever patter in keeping the audience in shrieks of laughter, while their exhibition of fine dancing fairly 'brought down the house'". Another reviewer described Clarke and Mostol's performance as "a sort of brief Baccanalia of mirth and motion". The writer singled out Clarke as the more accomplished of the two entertainers: "... but the gentleman with the giggle and the eyeglass is perhaps the easier, the less strained, of the two". Clarke and Mostol were featured in the programme of acts presented by Rickards at the Opera House in Melbourne from early October 1911.

From late-October 1911 Clarke and Mostol toured in New Zealand as part of The Harry Rickards' Tivoli Vaudeville Combination. Rickards' variety show performed in various theatres in New Zealand for two months. During January 1911 Clarke and Mostol returned to the Tivoli in Sydney and the Opera House in Melbourne. From early February 1912 Clarke and Mostol performed at the Melrose Theatre in Perth in a programme of vaudeville items and "animated pictures". A reviewer wrote that the pair "gave astonishing exhibitions of rapid dancing" and described their patter as "diverting", with a "freshness about some of their jokes that was distinctly pleasing". The comedy duo made their final Australian appearance on 19 February 1912.

=== Theatrical revues ===
In June 1913 Clarke played the character of 'Hon. G. P. Washington' in the revue Step This Way! at the Oxford Music Hall in Westminster, London. After two months the production moved to the Pavilion Theatre in London's East End where it had a successful run. During 1914 Clarke toured with the company performing Hullo Everybody!, a production of the revue and vaudeville promoter Harry Day. In late-October 1916 it was reported that a Harry Day production, Hip! Hip! Hooray! at the Ilford Hippodrome, was to feature George Clarke, "the inimitable dude comedian". Clark became a regular performer in revues produced by Harry Day throughout the war years and into the mid-1920s.

In early 1917 Clarke was a cast-member of Zig-Zag! at the London Hippodrome. The successful revue opened on 29 January and ran for 648 performances. He appeared in Here and There at the Empire Theatre in November 1917. In 1918 Clarke again appeared at the Hippodrome in Box o'Tricks. In about September that year he appeared in a production of Zig-Zag!, staged at the Folies Bergère in Paris.

During 1919 Clarke was a member of the touring company of the Harry Day musical comedy On the Wing, with Clarke and Isabelle Dillon in the leading roles. The production was a success and ended up playing in London's West End by the end of the year. In 1921 Clarke appeared in the revues Hullo Everybody! and Spangles, both Harry Day productions.

In March 1923 Clarke received top billing in the Harry Day revue Radios at the London Palladium. A reviewer for The Times described him as "a tremendous worker and a really clever comedian", adding: "Why he has been so long out of London at a time when the chief complaint about some of our revues is concerned with their lack of humour is a question which seems to call for an answer". Clarke's apparel in the show included "immaculate evening clothes" and "the dude's familiar equipment of a monocle". By mid-April Radios was playing in the Empire Theatre in Bristol. In July 1924 it was reported that Clarke was both the manager and "chief comedian" of the revue.

George Clarke performed in the Harry Day revue Records during 1925. In December 1925 he played the 'first shepherd' (alongside John Gielgud as the 'second shepherd') in E. K. Chambers's Old English Nativity Play at Daly's Theatre in London. In February 1926 Clarke performed in Charles Gulliver's musical revue Palladium Pleasures at the Palladium Theatre. At a time when American productions and actors were pervasive in London's entertainment scene, Palladium Pleasures was advertised as "an all-British revue, produced, staged and written by Britons, with even dress designing and scene painting by British artists".

In 1927-28 Clarke played the character of 'Harry Bassett' in a touring production of the musical Lido Lady (with songs by Richard Rodgers and Lorenz Hart). In 1928 he toured in Vogues and Vanities.

=== The car sketch ===
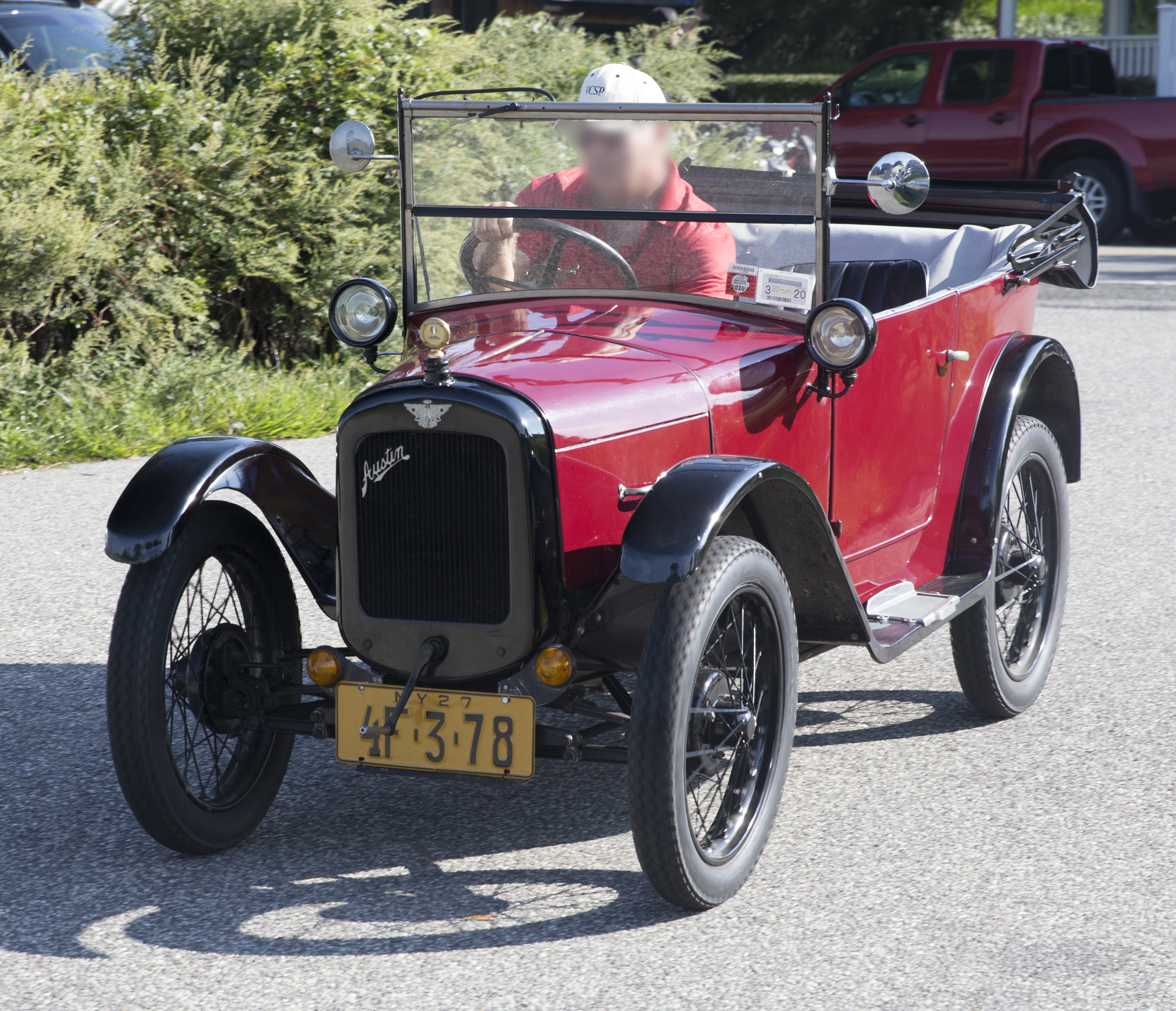
A 1927 Austin Seven Chummy Tourer, similar to the vehicle Clarke used in his stage-act.

In the late-1920s George Clarke began to develop a comedy sketch which involved him driving a car on stage. In his obituary in The Performer magazine it was described as "his most outstanding sketch". The vehicle was a yellow open-top Austin Seven Chummy Tourer, with blue mud-guards, a standard production-line car except for the finish on the body. Clarke expertly manoeuvred the vehicle for dramatic and comedic effect by the adept use of gears and brakes. He drove the car about the stage "with almost uncanny skill", giving the impression he had lost control of the vehicle. At one stage he would drive the car straight at the footlights, causing considerable consternation to the audience in the front rows; at the last moment he would change from first gear into reverse; the back of the vehicle would jump up in characteristic fashion before shooting backwards. Clarke may have begun to develop the sketch in the mid-1920s. One source describes him performing a routine in 1925 at the Palace Theatre in Plymouth which involved him driving "a brand new yellow Austin Seven car on the stage". Described as "the dapper little dude comedian", Clarke dared his infant daughter to bounce, "lest she broke the springs".

During 1929 Clarke played the lead role of 'Bertie Bundy', appearing with a monocle and minute moustache, in the musical comedy Darling! I Love You. The production was staged in principal variety theatres in England, including the Birmingham's Theatre Royal and the Birmingham Hippodrome. Darling! I Love You included a routine involving Clarke performing with his Austin Seven car in an erratic and performative manner. The scene was set in a wealthy suburban street and in the finale Clarke would drive right through a 'brick' wall, bringing down one of the buildings.

Clarke and an ensemble of English performers (Norah Dwyer, Gladys Gilbert, Dorothy Lawrence and Albert Morris) arrived in the United States in late-August 1929. They performed In New York at Keith's Fordham Theatre in The Bronx, presenting a fifteen minute rendition of His New Car for which Clarke adopted his usual stage persona (described by the American reviewer as "of the dude comedian type, possessing a heavy English lingo, sporting a monocle and dressed with unusual care"). He played the proud owner of the new vehicle ("one of those diminutive English cars"), fastidious in preserving its pristine condition. The culmination of the performance was when Clarke took the other cast members for a ride: "He manipulates the car in the fashion of a beginner, starting with jerks, grinding the gears, backfiring and general recklessness". Clarke also performed his car routine as part of a vaudeville show at New York's Palace Theatre. A reviewer for Billboard magazine praised his performance: "George Clarke, British dude funster with a brand of comedy that knows no national lines, ran up the highest laugh score of the show in the post-intermission spot in his superclever skit, His New Car".

From 22 January 1930 Darling, I Love You was produced at the Gaiety Theatre in London. A reviewer for Variety gave the production a scathing review, describing it as "one of those silly imitations of the American method which London managers think are what the public wants", adding that "the humor is dreadful... and there is scarcely any personality in the show". George Clarke was described as a "provincial comedian" making "his first appearance as the leading comedian in London". The reviewer claimed Clarke suffered from nervousness, concluding" "I daresay he is more funny when he hasn't got so many nerves". In spite of the poor reviews Darling, I Love You ran for 147 performances until June 1930 at the Gaiety Theatre.

In 1930 Clarke and his wife Mamie Watson were the featured actors in the short comedy film His First Car (later titled I'll Take That One), directed by Monty Banks for Gordon Bostock Productions.

=== Later career ===
George Clarke performed in three Royal Command Performances at the London Palladium during his career:

- On the first occasion he performed his comedy sketch His First Car as part of the Royal Command variety performance in May 1930.
- At the Royal Command Performance in May 1932 he performed with Madge Aubrey in a comedy sketch called 'The Service Flat' (from the musical revue By George!), which involved the pair driving in the Austin Seven car.
- At the Royal Command Performance in May 1934 Clarke was part of an ensemble cast in a sketch entitled The Miller's Daughter, playing "a would-be actor roped into a professional company".

The production of the musical comedy Blue Roses, with Clarke in the lead role (playing the character 'Chepstowe Potts'), toured successfully in regional theatres from about September 1930. In January 1931 Blue Roses commenced a season at the Gaiety Theatre in London. A reviewer described the production as "a light and bright show of the entirely conventional order". Clarke was described a "very amusing and finished comedian... who has several capital scenes and at least one brilliant dance". Nora Nicholson, who had a small part in the production, later commented: "We broke records on tour, but George, an enormous favourite in the provinces, somehow didn't go down with London audiences and our run at the Gaiety Theatre lasted a bare six weeks". Later in the year Clarke toured with Blue Roses and By George!.

Clarke played the lead role of 'George Muffit' in Here's George, a film directed by Redd Davis and released in September 1932.

In February 1933 Clarke and fellow comedian Marriott Edgar were the lead roles in the musical revue By George! at the Victoria Palace Theatre. During 1933-34 he toured in a production of Here We Go Round. From November 1934 the production toured in South Africa.

From August 1935 Clarke toured in Britain with Let's Join George, playing the character 'George Cann', and afterwards the production toured South Africa. During 1936-37 he toured Let's Join George and George Ahoy!, described as "a new comedy travelogue", in England. In 1937 he returned to South Africa with these productions. In 1938 Clarke toured England in Going Greek.

George Clarke's home base was at 'The Weir House', Maidenhead Court in Maidenhead, county Berkshire. He later moved to 'The Lodge' in Cox Green, Maidenhead.

In 1939 Clarke toured as 'George Lockwood' in It's That Man Again and as 'George Sterling' in Happy Birthday.

=== Last years ===
In the period 1942 to 1944 Clarke appeared as 'Buttons' in the Christmas pantomime Cinderella at Edinburgh, Newcastle and Liverpool. In 1943 Clarke played 'Jimmy Smith' in a touring production of No, No, Nanette. In 1944 he played 'Alfred Butler' in Ring Time and in 1945 he again toured in No, No, Nanette.

George Clarke died on 21 December 1946 in Maidenhead, Berkshire at the age of 60 after having surgery. At the time of his death, he was described by the Associated Press as the only vaudeville comedian to have "given three royal command performances".

== Filmography ==
- I'll Take That One (October 1930), Gordon Bostock Productions (short film).
- Here's George (December 1932), Thomas Charles Arnold Productions.

== Notes ==
A.Isabelle Donaldson Markey was born in September 1889 at Jhansi, in Uttar Pradesh, India, the daughter of John Markey and Henrietta (née Ritchie). Her father was the bandmaster of the 16th (The Queen's) Lancers. Isabelle died in September 1964 at Bournemouth (Boscombe), county Dorset.
