= Thulla =

Danish folk/pop and jazz singer (born 1963)

Thulla (Thulla Christina Wamberg; born 6 September 1963) is a Danish folk/pop and jazz singer.

Autodidact in music, words, images and sound, mainly influenced, as she states, by Tom Waits, Leonard Cohen, Marilyn Monroe and Björk. She had several great Jazz musicians from Denmark in her bands, the Thulla's Organic Orchestra (Ben Besiakov, (p), Dan Hemmer (ho), Hugo Rasmussen (b), Frands Rifbjerg (d), Lisbeth Diers (perc), and 2005 the Thullabandulla Band (Dan Hemmer (keys), Guffi Pallesen (b), Rune Harder Olesen (perc). The songs are mainly her own compositions and lyrics, mixed with international standards. Her newest band Thulla's Merry-go-round (2017), count Marie Louise Schmidt (Vox Continental, harmonica, keys), Eva Malling (bass) and on the album: Poul Achton (dr). Live on drums/perc: Jesper Uno.

Thulla was born in Copenhagen, and has a bachelor of Danish Literature from KUA, 1990. She received the National Arts Foundation's 2-year music-grant in 2000, and has also received a grant from the State Art Foundation. She toured all over Denmark with "Thulla's Organic Orchestra" as well as "Thullabandulla Band", and performed at Beijings Jazz Festival 2008. Participated in portraits on DR2, DR1, TV2 and Channel 4. She Composed the soundtrack for Greenland scientist John Andersen's "Around Greenland", 2009.

Contributed as a singer and composer to other projects, including Universal Funk - Later Black Lillies. Chiefeditor of the Composers' Association DJBFA's member magazine KOMPOST 2008-2012.

Thulla's first album was released in 1999. Her records are sold in Denmark as in Germany, Japan and Portugal.

== Discography ==
=== Albums ===
- Thulla. StarHouse 1999
- The Spirit of Yesterday. Cope Records (LeiCom) 2001
- Double up, please. Cope Records (LeiCom) 2002
- Evergreen Machine. Cope Records (LeiCom) 2003
- The Spirit of Yesterday. Cope Records (LeiCom)
- Thullabandulla Band: Life is a Car. Cope Records (LeiCom) 2005
- Retro Sisters & Schwanzen Sänger Knaben. Focus Recording. Thulla C. Wamberg, Ninna Milner Juel & Schwanzen Sänger Knaben. 2007
- Bleu: Blue City. Cope Records Thulla & Alain Apaloo. 2008
- The Spirit of Ice (QvintusArt) 2009
- 7 Shortcuts to Change (LifeChangingListening Thulla & cellist Halina Wigocka Wamberg. 2010)
- Thulla's Merry-go-round: Colony Collapse Disorder (MusikGalaxen 2017)

=== Singles ===
- Twilight Mood Thulla/Ninna Milner, 2003
- Make Music not War jazzmusicians pro peace, 2003 - with Thulla and Povl Dissing
- Thulla vs Pörder & Hinkola Rebellious Angel, 2004

=== Books ===
• The Evil Stepmother - Myth or Reality. Fischer & Schou, 1996

=== Theater ===
Composer/sounddesigner/actor at the following performances by author and dramatist Michael Svennevig:

• Ørkenshow. Teatret ved Sorte Hest, 2008

• HEGN. About a Refugee's Life and Dreams in Denmark. Teatret ved Sorte Hest, 2008

• The Silence spoke. Apostel Kirke, Vesterbro. 2009

• Handle me Life. Apostel Kirke, Vesterbro. 2011

• Festival of Theater, Træstubben, Vesterbro Naturværksted. 2014

• With Stine Bitsch-Larsen / Festival of Stories & Life Stories, Bethania Home, Frederiksberg. 2016

• Mainartist together with Mika Filborne through the festival Coffee - Yes please! in 3 districts of Copenhagen

• Composer/sound designer at My School Yard, Teatret Riddersalen, Frederiksberg in cooperation with Nyelandsvejens skole.

=== Trailers ===
Dreams & Visions, 2013

With'n without Jewelry, 2016

SwanWings, 2016

Coffee, Yes Please! 2017

About writer Stig Dalager, 2017
