= George Makana Clark =

Rhodesian writer

- Education: Florida State University
- Employer: University of Wisconsin-Madison
- Notable work: The Raw Man
- Title: Professor emeritus
- Awards: O'Henry Prize

George Makana Clark is a writer born in Rhodesia and living in Portugal. He is the author of the 2011 novel The Raw Man, as well as "The Center of the World", a short story for which he won the 2006 O'Henry Prize.

== Education ==
Clark earned a PhD from Florida State University.

== Career ==
In 1997, Clark published a short story collection called The Small Bees' Honey. He has seven stories anthologized in The Best American Short Stories series. In 2006 Clark won the O'Henry Prize for his short story "The Center of the World," published in the Georgia Review.

In 2011 Clark published The Raw Man. The Guardian said the novel, set during the Zimbabwean war for independence, "captures liminal characters at a liminal moment in Zimbabwe's history." The novel was translated into French by Cécile Chartres and Elisabeth Samama as Les Douze Portes dans la maison du sergent Gordon.
