= George Clarke (priest) =

British priest

George Clarke (1793-1871) was an Anglican priest: most notably Archdeacon of Antigua from 1850 to 1871.

Clarke was educated at St Catharine's College, Cambridge. Previously the Rector of St George, Dominica, he died on 16 May 1871; and his wife on 31 December 1878.
