= Alfredo Rodríguez (pianist, born 1985) =

Cuban composer and jazz pianist

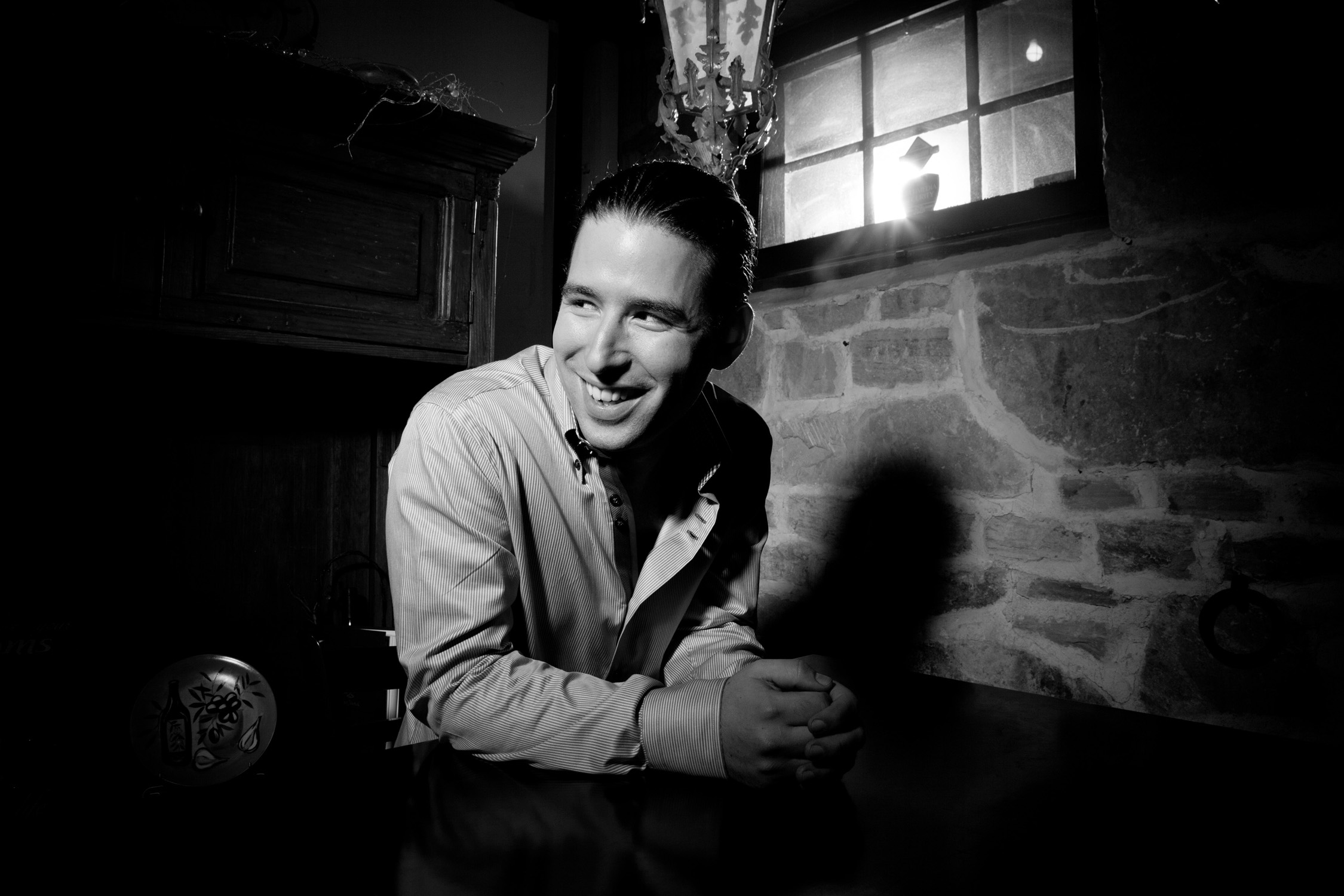

Background information
- Born: Alfredo Rodríguez; October 7, 1985 (age 41); Havana, Cuba
- Genre: Latin jazz
- Occupations: Musician, composer
- Instruments: Piano, synthesizer
- Years active: 2006 – present
- Label: Mack Avenue Records
- Website: www.alfredomusic.com

Alfredo Rodríguez Salicio (born October 7, 1985) is a Cuban composer and jazz pianist.

Alfredo Rodríguez is the older of two sons of Alfredo "Alfredito" Rodríguez, a professional singer, romantic song composer and television presenter and Mayra Salicio. He studied classical piano at the Manuel Saumell Conservatory, then at the Amadeo Roldán Conservatory of Music and at the Instituto Superior de Arte in Havana. Rodríguez's interest in jazz was stimulated by the annual "JoJazz" competition for young jazz musicians, where he won an honorable mention in 2003.

In 2006, Rodríguez was selected as one of twelve pianists from around the world to play at the Montreaux Jazz Festival. It was there that he met the late music icon Quincy Jones, who then became both his producer and a mentor.

One of Rodríguez's best-known compositions was made in collaboration with Quincy, Tan Dun, and Siedah Garrett; the anthem Better City, Better Life was selected as the official soundtrack of the 2010 Shanghai World Expo.

In 2015, Rodríguez received a Grammy nomination in the category "Best Instrumental Arrangement," for the song Guantanamera.

== Influences and playing style ==
A 2009 reviewer suggested that Rodríguez was "more a melding of Bill Evans, Kenny Werner, Fred Hersch, even touches of Thelonious Monk in conception if not execution, [with] hints here and there of his Cuban heritage".

Another critic in the same year wrote that, "In one tune, his crisp bebop lines recalled Bill Evans' early playing on the George Russell mid-fifties Jazz Workshop album. Other pieces suggested the melodic inventiveness of Keith Jarrett. And still others displayed a nascent style of his own, contrasting angular, leaping passages and thick harmonic clusters with sudden, unexpected arcs of lyricism".

== Discography ==
Year	Album	Label
2012	Sounds of Space	Mack Avenue
2014	The Invasion Parade	Mack Avenue
2016	Tocororo	Mack Avenue
2018	The Little Dream	Mack Avenue
2019	Duologue with Pedrito Martínez	Mack Avenue
2023	Coral Way	Mack Avenue
