= Lodewijk Parisius =

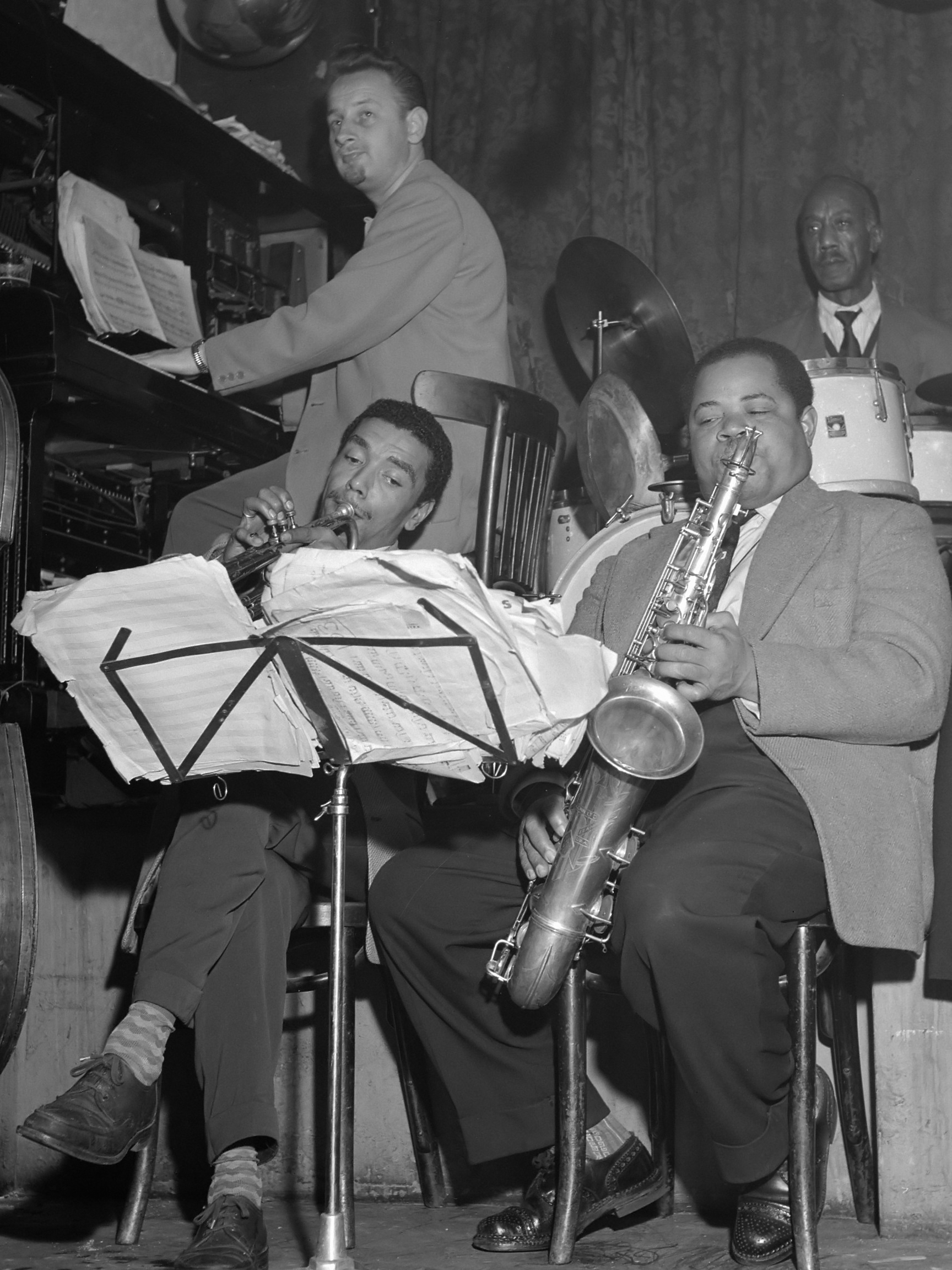
- Kid Dynamite (1956)

Background information
- Born: Lodewijk Rudolf Arthur Parisius; July 23, 1911; Hannover, Para District, Suriname
- Died: December 14, 1963 (aged 52) Germany
- Genres: Jazz
- Occupation: Saxophonist
- Instrument: Tenor saxophone

Lodewijk Rudolf Arthur Parisius (July 23, 1911 in Hannover, Para District, Suriname – December 14, 1963) was a Surinamese/Dutch tenor saxophonist commonly known after his stage name as "Kid Dynamite." He was noted for mixing jazz with Surinamese kaseko.

He also supported Coleman Hawkins's popularity in the Netherlands. He died in a road accident in Germany.
