= Billy Amstell =

British jazz reedist

Billy Amstell (20 August 1911 – 19 December 2005) was a British jazz reedist.

== Biography ==
At ten, Amstel he played piano, and at thirteen was teaching himself how to play alto saxophone. He performed in Glasgow, before moving to London in 1930, working with violinist Jack Harris. During the next year, he recorded with Roy Fox and Spike Hughes, and became a member of the Ambrose orchestra, in which he played tenor saxophone. In the 1940s, he worked for bandleader Geraldo and in the 1950s, for the BBC Dance Orchestra. He was a studio musician in the 1960s, working with George Chisholm.

He played clarinet in the 1980s, released a solo album, Session After Midnight (Zodiac, 1980), and wrote his autobiography, Don't Fuss, Mr. Ambrose. He continued to perform in his nineties.

His brother Mickey Amstell played saxophone. Billy Amstell was married to model and actress Tessa Amstell.
