= George Clarke (jazz musician) =

American jazz musician

- Born: August 28, 1911; Memphis, Tennessee, U.S.
- Died: September 1985 (aged 74); The Bronx, New York, U.S.
- Genres: Jazz
- Instruments: Tenor saxophone

George F. Clarke (August 28, 1911 – September 1985) was an American jazz tenor saxophonist.

== Early life and education ==
Clarke was born in Memphis, Tennessee. He attended Manassas High School, where he joined the Jimmie Lunceford Orchestra and played with the group until 1933.

== Career ==
After high school, Clarke then relocated to Buffalo, New York, playing there with Lil Hardin Armstrong and Stuff Smith in 1935. He worked with Smith again in 1939 and 1940 on tour and in the recording studio. Returning to Buffalo, Clarke led an ensemble at a local club from 1942 to 1954. Following this he moved to New York City, working with Wild Bill Davis and Jonah Jones, and touring internationally with Cootie Williams and Cozy Cole.
